

10001–10100 

|-bgcolor=#fefefe
| 10001 Palermo ||  ||  || October 8, 1969 || Nauchnij || L. I. Chernykh || Vslow || align=right | 4.1 km || 
|-id=002 bgcolor=#d6d6d6
| 10002 Bagdasarian ||  ||  || October 8, 1969 || Nauchnij || L. I. Chernykh || THM || align=right | 8.6 km || 
|-id=003 bgcolor=#fefefe
| 10003 Caryhuang ||  ||  || October 26, 1971 || Hamburg-Bergedorf || L. Kohoutek || — || align=right | 3.5 km || 
|-id=004 bgcolor=#d6d6d6
| 10004 Igormakarov ||  ||  || November 2, 1975 || Nauchnij || T. M. Smirnova || — || align=right | 8.1 km || 
|-id=005 bgcolor=#fefefe
| 10005 Chernega ||  ||  || September 24, 1976 || Nauchnij || N. S. Chernykh || — || align=right | 9.0 km || 
|-id=006 bgcolor=#E9E9E9
| 10006 Sessai ||  ||  || October 22, 1976 || Kiso || H. Kosai, K. Furukawa || — || align=right | 7.6 km || 
|-id=007 bgcolor=#d6d6d6
| 10007 Malytheatre ||  ||  || December 16, 1976 || Nauchnij || L. I. Chernykh || — || align=right | 26 km || 
|-id=008 bgcolor=#E9E9E9
| 10008 Raisanyo ||  ||  || February 18, 1977 || Kiso || H. Kosai, K. Furukawa || — || align=right | 5.5 km || 
|-id=009 bgcolor=#fefefe
| 10009 Hirosetanso ||  ||  || March 12, 1977 || Kiso || H. Kosai, K. Furukawa || — || align=right | 4.3 km || 
|-id=010 bgcolor=#fefefe
| 10010 Rudruna ||  ||  || August 9, 1978 || Nauchnij || N. S. Chernykh, L. I. Chernykh || V || align=right | 3.1 km || 
|-id=011 bgcolor=#fefefe
| 10011 Avidzba ||  ||  || August 31, 1978 || Nauchnij || N. S. Chernykh || — || align=right | 4.2 km || 
|-id=012 bgcolor=#fefefe
| 10012 Tmutarakania ||  ||  || September 3, 1978 || Nauchnij || N. S. Chernykh, L. G. Karachkina || NYS || align=right | 4.0 km || 
|-id=013 bgcolor=#fefefe
| 10013 Stenholm ||  ||  || September 2, 1978 || La Silla || C.-I. Lagerkvist || — || align=right | 10 km || 
|-id=014 bgcolor=#fefefe
| 10014 Shaim ||  ||  || September 26, 1978 || Nauchnij || L. V. Zhuravleva || — || align=right | 7.4 km || 
|-id=015 bgcolor=#fefefe
| 10015 Valenlebedev ||  ||  || September 27, 1978 || Nauchnij || L. I. Chernykh || — || align=right | 2.7 km || 
|-id=016 bgcolor=#fefefe
| 10016 Yugan ||  ||  || September 26, 1978 || Nauchnij || L. V. Zhuravleva || — || align=right | 3.0 km || 
|-id=017 bgcolor=#fefefe
| 10017 Jaotsungi ||  ||  || October 30, 1978 || Nanking || Purple Mountain Obs. || — || align=right | 4.5 km || 
|-id=018 bgcolor=#d6d6d6
| 10018 Lykawka ||  ||  || June 25, 1979 || Siding Spring || E. F. Helin, S. J. Bus || THM || align=right | 11 km || 
|-id=019 bgcolor=#d6d6d6
| 10019 Wesleyfraser ||  ||  || June 25, 1979 || Siding Spring || E. F. Helin, S. J. Bus || slow || align=right | 11 km || 
|-id=020 bgcolor=#d6d6d6
| 10020 Bagenal ||  ||  || July 24, 1979 || Palomar || S. J. Bus || — || align=right | 9.2 km || 
|-id=021 bgcolor=#fefefe
| 10021 Henja ||  ||  || August 22, 1979 || La Silla || C.-I. Lagerkvist || — || align=right | 7.2 km || 
|-id=022 bgcolor=#fefefe
| 10022 Zubov ||  ||  || September 22, 1979 || Nauchnij || N. S. Chernykh || V || align=right | 4.1 km || 
|-id=023 bgcolor=#fefefe
| 10023 Vladifedorov ||  ||  || November 17, 1979 || Nauchnij || L. I. Chernykh || MAS || align=right | 7.3 km || 
|-id=024 bgcolor=#fefefe
| 10024 Marthahazen || 1980 EB ||  || March 10, 1980 || Harvard Observatory || Harvard Obs. || — || align=right | 7.4 km || 
|-id=025 bgcolor=#d6d6d6
| 10025 Rauer ||  ||  || March 16, 1980 || La Silla || C.-I. Lagerkvist || KOR || align=right | 8.2 km || 
|-id=026 bgcolor=#E9E9E9
| 10026 Sophiexeon ||  ||  || September 3, 1980 || Kleť || A. Mrkos || KON || align=right | 11 km || 
|-id=027 bgcolor=#fefefe
| 10027 Perozzi || 1981 FL ||  || March 30, 1981 || Anderson Mesa || E. Bowell || — || align=right | 7.7 km || 
|-id=028 bgcolor=#fefefe
| 10028 Bonus ||  ||  || May 5, 1981 || Palomar || C. S. Shoemaker || NYS || align=right | 3.7 km || 
|-id=029 bgcolor=#E9E9E9
| 10029 Hiramperkins || 1981 QF ||  || August 30, 1981 || Anderson Mesa || E. Bowell || — || align=right | 3.7 km || 
|-id=030 bgcolor=#d6d6d6
| 10030 Philkeenan || 1981 QG ||  || August 30, 1981 || Anderson Mesa || E. Bowell || — || align=right | 11 km || 
|-id=031 bgcolor=#E9E9E9
| 10031 Vladarnolda ||  ||  || September 7, 1981 || Nauchnij || L. G. Karachkina || — || align=right | 6.3 km || 
|-id=032 bgcolor=#d6d6d6
| 10032 Hans-Ulrich ||  ||  || September 3, 1981 || Palomar || S. J. Bus || — || align=right | 5.7 km || 
|-id=033 bgcolor=#d6d6d6
| 10033 Bodewits ||  ||  || October 24, 1981 || Palomar || S. J. Bus || EOS || align=right | 8.3 km || 
|-id=034 bgcolor=#E9E9E9
| 10034 Birlan || 1981 YG ||  || December 30, 1981 || Anderson Mesa || E. Bowell || — || align=right | 10 km || 
|-id=035 bgcolor=#fefefe
| 10035 Davidgheesling ||  ||  || February 16, 1982 || Kleť || L. Brožek || — || align=right | 5.4 km || 
|-id=036 bgcolor=#fefefe
| 10036 McGaha || 1982 OF ||  || July 24, 1982 || Anderson Mesa || E. Bowell || — || align=right | 2.7 km || 
|-id=037 bgcolor=#fefefe
| 10037 Raypickard || 1984 BQ ||  || January 26, 1984 || Kleť || A. Mrkos || V || align=right | 5.5 km || 
|-id=038 bgcolor=#fefefe
| 10038 Tanaro ||  ||  || April 28, 1984 || La Silla || V. Zappalà || — || align=right | 3.2 km || 
|-id=039 bgcolor=#d6d6d6
| 10039 Keet Seel || 1984 LK ||  || June 2, 1984 || Anderson Mesa || B. A. Skiff || — || align=right | 11 km || 
|-id=040 bgcolor=#fefefe
| 10040 Ghillar || 1984 QM ||  || August 24, 1984 || Kleť || Z. Vávrová || FLO || align=right | 2.7 km || 
|-id=041 bgcolor=#fefefe
| 10041 Parkinson ||  ||  || April 24, 1985 || Palomar || C. S. Shoemaker, E. M. Shoemaker || PHO || align=right | 3.8 km || 
|-id=042 bgcolor=#E9E9E9
| 10042 Budstewart || 1985 PL ||  || August 14, 1985 || Anderson Mesa || E. Bowell || — || align=right | 6.2 km || 
|-id=043 bgcolor=#d6d6d6
| 10043 Janegann || 1985 PN ||  || August 14, 1985 || Anderson Mesa || E. Bowell || — || align=right | 16 km || 
|-id=044 bgcolor=#E9E9E9
| 10044 Squyres || 1985 RU ||  || September 15, 1985 || Palomar || C. S. Shoemaker, E. M. Shoemaker || — || align=right | 4.6 km || 
|-id=045 bgcolor=#d6d6d6
| 10045 Dorarussell ||  ||  || September 6, 1985 || La Silla || H. Debehogne || THM || align=right | 16 km || 
|-id=046 bgcolor=#fefefe
| 10046 Creighton || 1986 JC ||  || May 2, 1986 || Palomar || INAS || — || align=right | 10 km || 
|-id=047 bgcolor=#fefefe
| 10047 Davidchapman ||  ||  || August 28, 1986 || La Silla || H. Debehogne || — || align=right | 4.8 km || 
|-id=048 bgcolor=#d6d6d6
| 10048 Grönbech || 1986 TQ ||  || October 3, 1986 || Brorfelde || P. Jensen || — || align=right | 7.6 km || 
|-id=049 bgcolor=#d6d6d6
| 10049 Vorovich ||  ||  || October 3, 1986 || Nauchnij || L. G. Karachkina || — || align=right | 6.1 km || 
|-id=050 bgcolor=#E9E9E9
| 10050 Rayman ||  ||  || June 28, 1987 || Palomar || E. F. Helin || — || align=right | 13 km || 
|-id=051 bgcolor=#FA8072
| 10051 Albee ||  ||  || August 23, 1987 || Palomar || E. F. Helin || — || align=right | 2.2 km || 
|-id=052 bgcolor=#d6d6d6
| 10052 Nason ||  ||  || September 16, 1987 || La Silla || H. Debehogne || KOR || align=right | 6.1 km || 
|-id=053 bgcolor=#fefefe
| 10053 Noeldetilly ||  ||  || September 16, 1987 || La Silla || H. Debehogne || FLO || align=right | 4.5 km || 
|-id=054 bgcolor=#fefefe
| 10054 Solomin ||  ||  || September 17, 1987 || Nauchnij || L. I. Chernykh || FLO || align=right | 4.0 km || 
|-id=055 bgcolor=#d6d6d6
| 10055 Silcher ||  ||  || December 22, 1987 || Tautenburg Observatory || F. Börngen || — || align=right | 6.2 km || 
|-id=056 bgcolor=#fefefe
| 10056 Johnschroer ||  ||  || January 19, 1988 || La Silla || H. Debehogne || V || align=right | 4.0 km || 
|-id=057 bgcolor=#fefefe
| 10057 L'Obel ||  ||  || February 11, 1988 || La Silla || E. W. Elst || — || align=right | 7.8 km || 
|-id=058 bgcolor=#fefefe
| 10058 Ikwilliamson ||  ||  || February 25, 1988 || Siding Spring || R. H. McNaught || CHL || align=right | 6.2 km || 
|-id=059 bgcolor=#fefefe
| 10059 McCullough ||  ||  || March 21, 1988 || Smolyan || Bulgarian National Obs. || NYS || align=right | 4.4 km || 
|-id=060 bgcolor=#fefefe
| 10060 Amymilne || 1988 GL ||  || April 12, 1988 || Palomar || C. S. Shoemaker, E. M. Shoemaker || — || align=right | 4.5 km || 
|-id=061 bgcolor=#E9E9E9
| 10061 Ndolaprata ||  ||  || August 11, 1988 || Siding Spring || A. J. Noymer || — || align=right | 10 km || 
|-id=062 bgcolor=#E9E9E9
| 10062 Kimhay ||  ||  || September 1, 1988 || La Silla || H. Debehogne || — || align=right | 4.0 km || 
|-id=063 bgcolor=#d6d6d6
| 10063 Erinleeryan ||  ||  || September 16, 1988 || Cerro Tololo || S. J. Bus || 3:2 || align=right | 15 km || 
|-id=064 bgcolor=#E9E9E9
| 10064 Hirosetamotsu || 1988 UO ||  || October 31, 1988 || Chiyoda || T. Kojima || GEF || align=right | 9.6 km || 
|-id=065 bgcolor=#d6d6d6
| 10065 Greglisk || 1988 XK ||  || December 3, 1988 || Gekko || Y. Oshima || TRP || align=right | 12 km || 
|-id=066 bgcolor=#fefefe
| 10066 Pihack ||  ||  || December 1, 1988 || Brorfelde || P. Jensen || — || align=right | 2.6 km || 
|-id=067 bgcolor=#fefefe
| 10067 Bertuch ||  ||  || January 11, 1989 || Tautenburg Observatory || F. Börngen || — || align=right | 2.8 km || 
|-id=068 bgcolor=#fefefe
| 10068 Dodoens ||  ||  || February 4, 1989 || La Silla || E. W. Elst || V || align=right | 3.1 km || 
|-id=069 bgcolor=#d6d6d6
| 10069 Fontenelle ||  ||  || February 4, 1989 || La Silla || E. W. Elst || EOS || align=right | 12 km || 
|-id=070 bgcolor=#fefefe
| 10070 Liuzongli ||  ||  || February 7, 1989 || La Silla || H. Debehogne || — || align=right | 3.3 km || 
|-id=071 bgcolor=#fefefe
| 10071 Paraguay ||  ||  || March 2, 1989 || La Silla || E. W. Elst || — || align=right | 2.8 km || 
|-id=072 bgcolor=#fefefe
| 10072 Uruguay ||  ||  || April 3, 1989 || La Silla || E. W. Elst || — || align=right | 3.7 km || 
|-id=073 bgcolor=#fefefe
| 10073 Peterhiscocks ||  ||  || April 3, 1989 || La Silla || E. W. Elst || — || align=right | 5.0 km || 
|-id=074 bgcolor=#fefefe
| 10074 Van den Berghe ||  ||  || April 3, 1989 || La Silla || E. W. Elst || — || align=right | 3.9 km || 
|-id=075 bgcolor=#fefefe
| 10075 Campeche ||  ||  || April 3, 1989 || La Silla || E. W. Elst || — || align=right | 4.2 km || 
|-id=076 bgcolor=#E9E9E9
| 10076 Rogerhill || 1989 PK ||  || August 9, 1989 || Palomar || E. F. Helin || — || align=right | 6.5 km || 
|-id=077 bgcolor=#E9E9E9
| 10077 Raykoenig ||  ||  || October 26, 1989 || Kushiro || S. Ueda, H. Kaneda || — || align=right | 7.0 km || 
|-id=078 bgcolor=#E9E9E9
| 10078 Stanthorpe ||  ||  || October 30, 1989 || Geisei || T. Seki || EUN || align=right | 5.7 km || 
|-id=079 bgcolor=#E9E9E9
| 10079 Meunier ||  ||  || December 2, 1989 || La Silla || E. W. Elst || — || align=right | 4.3 km || 
|-id=080 bgcolor=#d6d6d6
| 10080 Macevans ||  ||  || July 18, 1990 || Palomar || E. F. Helin || — || align=right | 17 km || 
|-id=081 bgcolor=#fefefe
| 10081 Dantaylor ||  ||  || July 29, 1990 || Palomar || H. E. Holt || — || align=right | 3.5 km || 
|-id=082 bgcolor=#fefefe
| 10082 Bronson ||  ||  || July 29, 1990 || Palomar || H. E. Holt || ERI || align=right | 5.9 km || 
|-id=083 bgcolor=#fefefe
| 10083 Gordonanderson ||  ||  || August 22, 1990 || Palomar || H. E. Holt || FLO || align=right | 3.2 km || 
|-id=084 bgcolor=#fefefe
| 10084 Rossparker ||  ||  || August 25, 1990 || Palomar || H. E. Holt || — || align=right | 3.9 km || 
|-id=085 bgcolor=#d6d6d6
| 10085 Jekennedy ||  ||  || August 25, 1990 || Palomar || H. E. Holt || — || align=right | 19 km || 
|-id=086 bgcolor=#E9E9E9
| 10086 McCurdy || 1990 SZ ||  || September 16, 1990 || Palomar || H. E. Holt || — || align=right | 4.6 km || 
|-id=087 bgcolor=#fefefe
| 10087 Dechesne ||  ||  || September 18, 1990 || Palomar || H. E. Holt || NYS || align=right | 4.2 km || 
|-id=088 bgcolor=#fefefe
| 10088 Digne ||  ||  || September 22, 1990 || La Silla || E. W. Elst || NYS || align=right | 5.6 km || 
|-id=089 bgcolor=#fefefe
| 10089 Turgot ||  ||  || September 22, 1990 || La Silla || E. W. Elst || NYS || align=right | 4.0 km || 
|-id=090 bgcolor=#fefefe
| 10090 Sikorsky ||  ||  || October 13, 1990 || Nauchnij || L. G. Karachkina, G. R. Kastelʹ || V || align=right | 4.6 km || 
|-id=091 bgcolor=#fefefe
| 10091 Bandaisan ||  ||  || November 11, 1990 || Geisei || T. Seki || — || align=right | 4.1 km || 
|-id=092 bgcolor=#fefefe
| 10092 Sasaki ||  ||  || November 15, 1990 || Kitami || K. Endate, K. Watanabe || — || align=right | 2.9 km || 
|-id=093 bgcolor=#fefefe
| 10093 Diesel ||  ||  || November 18, 1990 || La Silla || E. W. Elst || V || align=right | 2.6 km || 
|-id=094 bgcolor=#E9E9E9
| 10094 Eijikato || 1991 DK ||  || February 20, 1991 || Geisei || T. Seki || MAR || align=right | 9.5 km || 
|-id=095 bgcolor=#d6d6d6
| 10095 Carlloewe ||  ||  || September 9, 1991 || Tautenburg Observatory || F. Börngen, L. D. Schmadel || EOS || align=right | 10 km || 
|-id=096 bgcolor=#d6d6d6
| 10096 Colleenohare ||  ||  || September 13, 1991 || Palomar || H. E. Holt || EOS || align=right | 11 km || 
|-id=097 bgcolor=#fefefe
| 10097 Humbroncos ||  ||  || September 15, 1991 || Palomar || H. E. Holt || — || align=right | 2.9 km || 
|-id=098 bgcolor=#d6d6d6
| 10098 Jaymiematthews ||  ||  || September 30, 1991 || Siding Spring || R. H. McNaught || EOS || align=right | 8.8 km || 
|-id=099 bgcolor=#d6d6d6
| 10099 Glazebrook ||  ||  || November 4, 1991 || Kitt Peak || Spacewatch || THM || align=right | 10 km || 
|-id=100 bgcolor=#fefefe
| 10100 Bürgel ||  ||  || December 10, 1991 || Tautenburg Observatory || F. Börngen || MAS || align=right | 3.8 km || 
|}

10101–10200 

|-bgcolor=#fefefe
| 10101 Fourier ||  ||  || January 30, 1992 || La Silla || E. W. Elst || FLO || align=right | 3.4 km || 
|-id=102 bgcolor=#fefefe
| 10102 Digerhuvud ||  ||  || February 29, 1992 || La Silla || UESAC || MAS || align=right | 2.8 km || 
|-id=103 bgcolor=#fefefe
| 10103 Jungfrun ||  ||  || February 29, 1992 || La Silla || UESAC || — || align=right | 4.4 km || 
|-id=104 bgcolor=#fefefe
| 10104 Hoburgsgubben ||  ||  || March 2, 1992 || La Silla || UESAC || — || align=right | 4.3 km || 
|-id=105 bgcolor=#d6d6d6
| 10105 Holmhällar ||  ||  || March 6, 1992 || La Silla || UESAC || THM || align=right | 12 km || 
|-id=106 bgcolor=#fefefe
| 10106 Lergrav ||  ||  || March 1, 1992 || La Silla || UESAC || NYS || align=right | 1.9 km || 
|-id=107 bgcolor=#fefefe
| 10107 Kenny ||  ||  || March 27, 1992 || Siding Spring || D. I. Steel || PHO || align=right | 3.2 km || 
|-id=108 bgcolor=#fefefe
| 10108 Tomlinson || 1992 HM ||  || April 26, 1992 || Palomar || C. S. Shoemaker, E. M. Shoemaker || PHO || align=right | 4.8 km || 
|-id=109 bgcolor=#E9E9E9
| 10109 Sidhu || 1992 KQ ||  || May 29, 1992 || Palomar || E. F. Helin || EUN || align=right | 9.5 km || 
|-id=110 bgcolor=#fefefe
| 10110 Jameshead || 1992 LJ ||  || June 3, 1992 || Palomar || G. J. Leonard || — || align=right | 4.8 km || 
|-id=111 bgcolor=#E9E9E9
| 10111 Fresnel ||  ||  || July 25, 1992 || Caussols || E. W. Elst || — || align=right | 9.9 km || 
|-id=112 bgcolor=#d6d6d6
| 10112 Skookumjim ||  ||  || July 31, 1992 || Palomar || H. E. Holt || — || align=right | 8.7 km || 
|-id=113 bgcolor=#E9E9E9
| 10113 Alantitle ||  ||  || August 6, 1992 || Palomar || H. E. Holt || — || align=right | 12 km || 
|-id=114 bgcolor=#d6d6d6
| 10114 Greifswald || 1992 RZ ||  || September 4, 1992 || Tautenburg Observatory || L. D. Schmadel, F. Börngen || KOR || align=right | 7.9 km || 
|-id=115 bgcolor=#FFC2E0
| 10115 || 1992 SK || — || September 24, 1992 || Palomar || E. F. Helin, J. Alu || APO +1kmPHA || align=right data-sort-value="0.94" | 940 m || 
|-id=116 bgcolor=#d6d6d6
| 10116 Robertfranz ||  ||  || September 21, 1992 || Tautenburg Observatory || F. Börngen, L. D. Schmadel || EOS || align=right | 8.6 km || 
|-id=117 bgcolor=#d6d6d6
| 10117 Tanikawa || 1992 TW ||  || October 1, 1992 || Kitami || M. Yanai, K. Watanabe || EOS || align=right | 9.1 km || 
|-id=118 bgcolor=#E9E9E9
| 10118 Jiwu ||  ||  || October 19, 1992 || Kushiro || S. Ueda, H. Kaneda || GEF || align=right | 7.3 km || 
|-id=119 bgcolor=#d6d6d6
| 10119 Remarque ||  ||  || December 18, 1992 || Caussols || E. W. Elst || THM || align=right | 14 km || 
|-id=120 bgcolor=#d6d6d6
| 10120 Ypres ||  ||  || December 18, 1992 || Caussols || E. W. Elst || VER || align=right | 13 km || 
|-id=121 bgcolor=#d6d6d6
| 10121 Arzamas ||  ||  || January 27, 1993 || Caussols || E. W. Elst || THM || align=right | 11 km || 
|-id=122 bgcolor=#d6d6d6
| 10122 Fröding ||  ||  || January 27, 1993 || Caussols || E. W. Elst || THM || align=right | 12 km || 
|-id=123 bgcolor=#fefefe
| 10123 Fideöja ||  ||  || March 17, 1993 || La Silla || UESAC || moon || align=right | 3.5 km || 
|-id=124 bgcolor=#fefefe
| 10124 Hemse ||  ||  || March 21, 1993 || La Silla || UESAC || — || align=right | 5.2 km || 
|-id=125 bgcolor=#fefefe
| 10125 Stenkyrka ||  ||  || March 21, 1993 || La Silla || UESAC || FLO || align=right | 3.4 km || 
|-id=126 bgcolor=#fefefe
| 10126 Lärbro ||  ||  || March 21, 1993 || La Silla || UESAC || — || align=right | 4.1 km || 
|-id=127 bgcolor=#fefefe
| 10127 Fröjel ||  ||  || March 21, 1993 || La Silla || UESAC || FLO || align=right | 2.0 km || 
|-id=128 bgcolor=#fefefe
| 10128 Bro ||  ||  || March 19, 1993 || La Silla || UESAC || — || align=right | 3.5 km || 
|-id=129 bgcolor=#fefefe
| 10129 Fole ||  ||  || March 19, 1993 || La Silla || UESAC || — || align=right | 3.2 km || 
|-id=130 bgcolor=#fefefe
| 10130 Ardre ||  ||  || March 19, 1993 || La Silla || UESAC || — || align=right | 3.0 km || 
|-id=131 bgcolor=#fefefe
| 10131 Stånga ||  ||  || March 21, 1993 || La Silla || UESAC || FLO || align=right | 1.9 km || 
|-id=132 bgcolor=#fefefe
| 10132 Lummelunda ||  ||  || March 20, 1993 || La Silla || UESAC || moon || align=right | 3.6 km || 
|-id=133 bgcolor=#fefefe
| 10133 Gerdahorneck ||  ||  || April 15, 1993 || Palomar || H. E. Holt || FLO || align=right | 5.4 km || 
|-id=134 bgcolor=#fefefe
| 10134 Joycepenner ||  ||  || April 17, 1993 || La Silla || H. Debehogne || — || align=right | 4.6 km || 
|-id=135 bgcolor=#fefefe
| 10135 Wimhermsen ||  ||  || June 13, 1993 || Palomar || H. E. Holt || V || align=right | 4.5 km || 
|-id=136 bgcolor=#fefefe
| 10136 Gauguin ||  ||  || July 20, 1993 || La Silla || E. W. Elst || FLO || align=right | 3.5 km || 
|-id=137 bgcolor=#fefefe
| 10137 Thucydides ||  ||  || August 15, 1993 || Caussols || E. W. Elst || — || align=right | 3.3 km || 
|-id=138 bgcolor=#E9E9E9
| 10138 Ohtanihiroshi ||  ||  || September 16, 1993 || Kitami || K. Endate, K. Watanabe || — || align=right | 4.8 km || 
|-id=139 bgcolor=#fefefe
| 10139 Ronsard ||  ||  || September 19, 1993 || Caussols || E. W. Elst || — || align=right | 4.0 km || 
|-id=140 bgcolor=#fefefe
| 10140 Villon ||  ||  || September 19, 1993 || Caussols || E. W. Elst || NYS || align=right | 4.8 km || 
|-id=141 bgcolor=#E9E9E9
| 10141 Gotenba || 1993 VE ||  || November 5, 1993 || Kiyosato || S. Otomo || EUN || align=right | 9.3 km || 
|-id=142 bgcolor=#E9E9E9
| 10142 Sakka ||  ||  || November 15, 1993 || Dynic || A. Sugie || — || align=right | 10 km || 
|-id=143 bgcolor=#d6d6d6
| 10143 Kamogawa ||  ||  || January 8, 1994 || Dynic || A. Sugie || — || align=right | 22 km || 
|-id=144 bgcolor=#d6d6d6
| 10144 Bernardbigot ||  ||  || January 9, 1994 || Yatsugatake || Y. Kushida, O. Muramatsu || — || align=right | 7.1 km || 
|-id=145 bgcolor=#FFC2E0
| 10145 ||  || — || February 10, 1994 || Kitt Peak || Spacewatch || APO +1km || align=right | 1.4 km || 
|-id=146 bgcolor=#d6d6d6
| 10146 Mukaitadashi ||  ||  || February 8, 1994 || Kitami || K. Endate, K. Watanabe || — || align=right | 10 km || 
|-id=147 bgcolor=#d6d6d6
| 10147 Mizugatsuka ||  ||  || February 13, 1994 || Ōizumi || T. Kobayashi || THM || align=right | 12 km || 
|-id=148 bgcolor=#d6d6d6
| 10148 Shirase ||  ||  || April 14, 1994 || Kiyosato || S. Otomo || THM || align=right | 16 km || 
|-id=149 bgcolor=#fefefe
| 10149 Cavagna || 1994 PA ||  || August 3, 1994 || San Marcello || M. Tombelli, A. Boattini || — || align=right | 2.2 km || 
|-id=150 bgcolor=#FFC2E0
| 10150 || 1994 PN || — || August 7, 1994 || Siding Spring || G. J. Garradd || AMO +1km || align=right | 2.9 km || 
|-id=151 bgcolor=#fefefe
| 10151 Rubens ||  ||  || August 12, 1994 || La Silla || E. W. Elst || FLO || align=right | 5.0 km || 
|-id=152 bgcolor=#fefefe
| 10152 Ukichiro ||  ||  || September 11, 1994 || Kiyosato || S. Otomo || V || align=right | 4.6 km || 
|-id=153 bgcolor=#fefefe
| 10153 Goldman || 1994 UB ||  || October 26, 1994 || Sudbury || D. di Cicco || — || align=right | 3.7 km || 
|-id=154 bgcolor=#fefefe
| 10154 Tanuki || 1994 UH ||  || October 31, 1994 || Ōizumi || T. Kobayashi || — || align=right | 4.1 km || 
|-id=155 bgcolor=#fefefe
| 10155 Numaguti ||  ||  || November 4, 1994 || Kitami || K. Endate, K. Watanabe || — || align=right | 3.6 km || 
|-id=156 bgcolor=#fefefe
| 10156 ||  || — || November 7, 1994 || Kushiro || S. Ueda, H. Kaneda || FLO || align=right | 2.8 km || 
|-id=157 bgcolor=#fefefe
| 10157 Asagiri ||  ||  || November 27, 1994 || Ōizumi || T. Kobayashi || V || align=right | 3.5 km || 
|-id=158 bgcolor=#fefefe
| 10158 Taroubou || 1994 XK ||  || December 3, 1994 || Ōizumi || T. Kobayashi || — || align=right | 5.0 km || 
|-id=159 bgcolor=#fefefe
| 10159 Tokara ||  ||  || December 9, 1994 || Ōizumi || T. Kobayashi || — || align=right | 4.6 km || 
|-id=160 bgcolor=#fefefe
| 10160 Totoro ||  ||  || December 31, 1994 || Ōizumi || T. Kobayashi || V || align=right | 3.1 km || 
|-id=161 bgcolor=#fefefe
| 10161 Nakanoshima ||  ||  || December 31, 1994 || Ōizumi || T. Kobayashi || — || align=right | 3.9 km || 
|-id=162 bgcolor=#fefefe
| 10162 Issunboushi || 1995 AL ||  || January 2, 1995 || Ojima || T. Niijima, T. Urata || — || align=right | 3.3 km || 
|-id=163 bgcolor=#fefefe
| 10163 Onomichi ||  ||  || January 26, 1995 || Kuma Kogen || A. Nakamura || NYS || align=right | 1.7 km || 
|-id=164 bgcolor=#E9E9E9
| 10164 Akusekijima ||  ||  || January 27, 1995 || Ōizumi || T. Kobayashi || — || align=right | 7.6 km || 
|-id=165 bgcolor=#FFC2E0
| 10165 ||  || — || January 31, 1995 || Kitt Peak || Spacewatch || APO +1km || align=right data-sort-value="0.83" | 830 m || 
|-id=166 bgcolor=#E9E9E9
| 10166 Takarajima ||  ||  || January 30, 1995 || Ōizumi || T. Kobayashi || — || align=right | 4.9 km || 
|-id=167 bgcolor=#fefefe
| 10167 Yoshiwatiso ||  ||  || January 31, 1995 || Geisei || T. Seki || NYS || align=right | 4.2 km || 
|-id=168 bgcolor=#E9E9E9
| 10168 Stony Ridge || 1995 CN ||  || February 4, 1995 || Stony Ridge || J. B. Child, J. E. Rogers || — || align=right | 5.5 km || 
|-id=169 bgcolor=#d6d6d6
| 10169 Ogasawara || 1995 DK ||  || February 21, 1995 || Ōizumi || T. Kobayashi || — || align=right | 7.4 km || 
|-id=170 bgcolor=#E9E9E9
| 10170 Petrjakeš ||  ||  || February 22, 1995 || Kleť || M. Tichý, Z. Moravec || — || align=right | 6.5 km || 
|-id=171 bgcolor=#E9E9E9
| 10171 Takaotengu ||  ||  || March 7, 1995 || Nyukasa || M. Hirasawa, S. Suzuki || — || align=right | 14 km || 
|-id=172 bgcolor=#E9E9E9
| 10172 Humphreys ||  ||  || March 31, 1995 || Kitt Peak || Spacewatch || PAD || align=right | 9.8 km || 
|-id=173 bgcolor=#d6d6d6
| 10173 Hanzelkazikmund || 1995 HA ||  || April 21, 1995 || Ondřejov || P. Pravec, L. Kotková || EOS || align=right | 6.0 km || 
|-id=174 bgcolor=#E9E9E9
| 10174 Emička || 1995 JD ||  || May 2, 1995 || Kleť || Z. Moravec || — || align=right | 4.5 km || 
|-id=175 bgcolor=#fefefe
| 10175 Aenona ||  ||  || February 14, 1996 || Višnjan Observatory || K. Korlević, D. Matković || V || align=right | 4.0 km || 
|-id=176 bgcolor=#fefefe
| 10176 Gaiavettori ||  ||  || February 14, 1996 || Cima Ekar || M. Tombelli, U. Munari || — || align=right | 2.9 km || 
|-id=177 bgcolor=#fefefe
| 10177 Ellison ||  ||  || February 10, 1996 || Kitt Peak || Spacewatch || V || align=right | 4.9 km || 
|-id=178 bgcolor=#fefefe
| 10178 Iriki || 1996 DD ||  || February 18, 1996 || Ōizumi || T. Kobayashi || — || align=right | 3.2 km || 
|-id=179 bgcolor=#E9E9E9
| 10179 Ishigaki || 1996 DE ||  || February 18, 1996 || Ōizumi || T. Kobayashi || MAR || align=right | 6.3 km || 
|-id=180 bgcolor=#fefefe
| 10180 ||  || — || March 15, 1996 || Loomberah || G. J. Garradd || — || align=right | 3.6 km || 
|-id=181 bgcolor=#fefefe
| 10181 Davidacomba ||  ||  || March 26, 1996 || Prescott || P. G. Comba || FLO || align=right | 1.4 km || 
|-id=182 bgcolor=#fefefe
| 10182 Junkobiwaki ||  ||  || March 20, 1996 || Kitami || K. Endate, K. Watanabe || — || align=right | 4.8 km || 
|-id=183 bgcolor=#fefefe
| 10183 Ampère ||  ||  || April 15, 1996 || La Silla || E. W. Elst || — || align=right | 2.4 km || 
|-id=184 bgcolor=#fefefe
| 10184 Galvani ||  ||  || April 18, 1996 || La Silla || E. W. Elst || — || align=right | 3.2 km || 
|-id=185 bgcolor=#E9E9E9
| 10185 Gaudi ||  ||  || April 18, 1996 || La Silla || E. W. Elst || — || align=right | 6.2 km || 
|-id=186 bgcolor=#fefefe
| 10186 Albéniz ||  ||  || April 20, 1996 || La Silla || E. W. Elst || — || align=right | 4.0 km || 
|-id=187 bgcolor=#fefefe
| 10187 || 1996 JV || — || May 12, 1996 || Catalina Station || T. B. Spahr || PHO || align=right | 6.2 km || 
|-id=188 bgcolor=#fefefe
| 10188 Yasuoyoneda || 1996 JY ||  || May 14, 1996 || Moriyama || R. H. McNaught, Y. Ikari || — || align=right | 5.4 km || 
|-id=189 bgcolor=#E9E9E9
| 10189 Normanrockwell ||  ||  || May 15, 1996 || Kitt Peak || Spacewatch || — || align=right | 9.7 km || 
|-id=190 bgcolor=#d6d6d6
| 10190 || 1996 NC || — || July 14, 1996 || Haleakalā || NEAT || — || align=right | 5.1 km || 
|-id=191 bgcolor=#E9E9E9
| 10191 ||  || — || July 14, 1996 || Haleakalā || NEAT || — || align=right | 12 km || 
|-id=192 bgcolor=#d6d6d6
| 10192 ||  || — || July 20, 1996 || Xinglong || SCAP || KOR || align=right | 4.4 km || 
|-id=193 bgcolor=#d6d6d6
| 10193 Nishimoto ||  ||  || August 8, 1996 || Haleakalā || AMOS || — || align=right | 8.6 km || 
|-id=194 bgcolor=#d6d6d6
| 10194 ||  || — || August 18, 1996 || Rand || G. R. Viscome || — || align=right | 7.6 km || 
|-id=195 bgcolor=#d6d6d6
| 10195 Nebraska ||  ||  || September 13, 1996 || Lime Creek || R. Linderholm || — || align=right | 10 km || 
|-id=196 bgcolor=#d6d6d6
| 10196 ||  || — || October 9, 1996 || Kushiro || S. Ueda, H. Kaneda || THM || align=right | 10 km || 
|-id=197 bgcolor=#d6d6d6
| 10197 Senigalliesi || 1996 UO ||  || October 18, 1996 || Pianoro || V. Goretti || KOR || align=right | 6.6 km || 
|-id=198 bgcolor=#d6d6d6
| 10198 Pinelli ||  ||  || December 6, 1996 || Asiago || M. Tombelli, U. Munari || KOR || align=right | 6.5 km || 
|-id=199 bgcolor=#C7FF8F
| 10199 Chariklo ||  ||  || February 15, 1997 || Spacewatch || Spacewatch || centaurmoon || align=right | 302 km || 
|-id=200 bgcolor=#E9E9E9
| 10200 Quadri ||  ||  || July 7, 1997 || Pianoro || V. Goretti || — || align=right | 6.2 km || 
|}

10201–10300 

|-bgcolor=#fefefe
| 10201 Korado ||  ||  || July 12, 1997 || Farra d'Isonzo || Farra d'Isonzo || — || align=right | 2.3 km || 
|-id=202 bgcolor=#fefefe
| 10202 || 1997 PE || — || August 1, 1997 || Haleakalā || NEAT || V || align=right | 4.4 km || 
|-id=203 bgcolor=#fefefe
| 10203 Flinders || 1997 PQ ||  || August 1, 1997 || Woomera || F. B. Zoltowski || FLO || align=right | 3.6 km || 
|-id=204 bgcolor=#E9E9E9
| 10204 Turing ||  ||  || August 1, 1997 || Prescott || P. G. Comba || — || align=right | 4.4 km || 
|-id=205 bgcolor=#fefefe
| 10205 Pokorný ||  ||  || August 7, 1997 || Kleť || M. Tichý, Z. Moravec || FLO || align=right | 4.8 km || 
|-id=206 bgcolor=#fefefe
| 10206 ||  || — || August 7, 1997 || Fitchburg || L. L. Amburgey || — || align=right | 3.5 km || 
|-id=207 bgcolor=#fefefe
| 10207 Comeniana || 1997 QA ||  || August 16, 1997 || Modra || L. Kornoš, P. Kolény || — || align=right | 4.9 km || 
|-id=208 bgcolor=#fefefe
| 10208 Germanicus ||  ||  || August 30, 1997 || Stroncone || A. Vagnozzi || FLOmoon || align=right | 3.6 km || 
|-id=209 bgcolor=#fefefe
| 10209 Izanaki ||  ||  || August 24, 1997 || Nachi-Katsuura || Y. Shimizu, T. Urata || NYS || align=right | 4.3 km || 
|-id=210 bgcolor=#fefefe
| 10210 Nathues ||  ||  || August 30, 1997 || Caussols || ODAS || — || align=right | 4.5 km || 
|-id=211 bgcolor=#fefefe
| 10211 La Spezia ||  ||  || September 6, 1997 || Monte Viseggi || Monte Viseggi Obs. || NYS || align=right | 3.3 km || 
|-id=212 bgcolor=#fefefe
| 10212 ||  || — || September 3, 1997 || Church Stretton || S. P. Laurie || — || align=right | 4.8 km || 
|-id=213 bgcolor=#fefefe
| 10213 Koukolík ||  ||  || September 10, 1997 || Kleť || M. Tichý, Z. Moravec || — || align=right | 3.4 km || 
|-id=214 bgcolor=#E9E9E9
| 10214 ||  || — || September 10, 1997 || Uccle || T. Pauwels || — || align=right | 5.2 km || 
|-id=215 bgcolor=#d6d6d6
| 10215 Lavilledemirmont || 1997 SQ ||  || September 20, 1997 || Ondřejov || L. Kotková || — || align=right | 7.0 km || 
|-id=216 bgcolor=#E9E9E9
| 10216 Popastro ||  ||  || September 22, 1997 || Church Stretton || S. P. Laurie || MRX || align=right | 5.9 km || 
|-id=217 bgcolor=#E9E9E9
| 10217 Richardcook ||  ||  || September 27, 1997 || Haleakalā || NEAT || — || align=right | 7.7 km || 
|-id=218 bgcolor=#fefefe
| 10218 Bierstadt ||  ||  || September 29, 1997 || Kitt Peak || Spacewatch || — || align=right | 3.4 km || 
|-id=219 bgcolor=#fefefe
| 10219 Penco ||  ||  || October 25, 1997 || San Marcello || L. Tesi, A. Boattini || — || align=right | 3.4 km || 
|-id=220 bgcolor=#E9E9E9
| 10220 Pigott ||  ||  || October 20, 1997 || Goodricke-Pigott || R. A. Tucker || EUN || align=right | 4.5 km || 
|-id=221 bgcolor=#fefefe
| 10221 Kubrick ||  ||  || October 28, 1997 || Ondřejov || P. Pravec || — || align=right | 4.2 km || 
|-id=222 bgcolor=#E9E9E9
| 10222 Klotz ||  ||  || October 29, 1997 || Ramonville || C. Buil || GEF || align=right | 7.5 km || 
|-id=223 bgcolor=#d6d6d6
| 10223 Zashikiwarashi ||  ||  || October 31, 1997 || Oohira || T. Urata || THM || align=right | 11 km || 
|-id=224 bgcolor=#fefefe
| 10224 Hisashi ||  ||  || October 26, 1997 || Chichibu || N. Satō || — || align=right | 8.5 km || 
|-id=225 bgcolor=#d6d6d6
| 10225 ||  || — || November 1, 1997 || Kushiro || S. Ueda, H. Kaneda || — || align=right | 14 km || 
|-id=226 bgcolor=#fefefe
| 10226 Seishika ||  ||  || November 8, 1997 || Ōizumi || T. Kobayashi || — || align=right | 16 km || 
|-id=227 bgcolor=#d6d6d6
| 10227 Izanami ||  ||  || November 4, 1997 || Gekko || T. Kagawa, T. Urata || — || align=right | 17 km || 
|-id=228 bgcolor=#d6d6d6
| 10228 ||  || — || November 1, 1997 || Kushiro || S. Ueda, H. Kaneda || EOS || align=right | 8.9 km || 
|-id=229 bgcolor=#fefefe
| 10229 ||  || — || November 19, 1997 || Nachi-Katsuura || Y. Shimizu, T. Urata || V || align=right | 4.4 km || 
|-id=230 bgcolor=#d6d6d6
| 10230 ||  || — || November 29, 1997 || Socorro || LINEAR || KOR || align=right | 5.5 km || 
|-id=231 bgcolor=#d6d6d6
| 10231 ||  || — || November 29, 1997 || Socorro || LINEAR || — || align=right | 5.2 km || 
|-id=232 bgcolor=#d6d6d6
| 10232 ||  || — || November 26, 1997 || Socorro || LINEAR || — || align=right | 9.3 km || 
|-id=233 bgcolor=#E9E9E9
| 10233 Le Creusot ||  ||  || December 5, 1997 || Le Creusot || J.-C. Merlin || — || align=right | 6.1 km || 
|-id=234 bgcolor=#d6d6d6
| 10234 Sixtygarden ||  ||  || December 27, 1997 || Kleť || J. Tichá, M. Tichý || EOS || align=right | 9.1 km || 
|-id=235 bgcolor=#d6d6d6
| 10235 ||  || — || August 17, 1998 || Socorro || LINEAR || — || align=right | 10 km || 
|-id=236 bgcolor=#fefefe
| 10236 ||  || — || August 28, 1998 || Socorro || LINEAR || FLO || align=right | 5.4 km || 
|-id=237 bgcolor=#fefefe
| 10237 Adzic ||  ||  || September 26, 1998 || Socorro || LINEAR || — || align=right | 2.1 km || 
|-id=238 bgcolor=#fefefe
| 10238 ||  || — || September 26, 1998 || Socorro || LINEAR || — || align=right | 3.1 km || 
|-id=239 bgcolor=#d6d6d6
| 10239 Hermann ||  ||  || October 10, 1998 || Anderson Mesa || LONEOS || — || align=right | 18 km || 
|-id=240 bgcolor=#d6d6d6
| 10240 ||  || — || November 12, 1998 || Kushiro || S. Ueda, H. Kaneda || KOR || align=right | 4.7 km || 
|-id=241 bgcolor=#d6d6d6
| 10241 Miličević ||  ||  || January 9, 1999 || Višnjan Observatory || K. Korlević || THM || align=right | 11 km || 
|-id=242 bgcolor=#fefefe
| 10242 Wasserkuppe || 2808 P-L ||  || September 24, 1960 || Palomar || PLS || NYS || align=right | 2.5 km || 
|-id=243 bgcolor=#E9E9E9
| 10243 Hohe Meissner || 3553 P-L ||  || October 22, 1960 || Palomar || PLS || — || align=right | 9.9 km || 
|-id=244 bgcolor=#fefefe
| 10244 Thüringer Wald || 4668 P-L ||  || September 26, 1960 || Palomar || PLS || V || align=right | 3.3 km || 
|-id=245 bgcolor=#E9E9E9
| 10245 Inselsberg || 6071 P-L ||  || September 24, 1960 || Palomar || PLS || GEF || align=right | 6.5 km || 
|-id=246 bgcolor=#E9E9E9
| 10246 Frankenwald || 6381 P-L ||  || September 24, 1960 || Palomar || PLS || — || align=right | 3.5 km || 
|-id=247 bgcolor=#C2FFFF
| 10247 Amphiaraos || 6629 P-L ||  || September 24, 1960 || Palomar || PLS || L4 || align=right | 27 km || 
|-id=248 bgcolor=#E9E9E9
| 10248 Fichtelgebirge || 7639 P-L ||  || October 17, 1960 || Palomar || PLS || — || align=right | 7.0 km || 
|-id=249 bgcolor=#E9E9E9
| 10249 Harz || 9515 P-L ||  || October 17, 1960 || Palomar || PLS || — || align=right | 3.6 km || 
|-id=250 bgcolor=#fefefe
| 10250 Hellahaasse || 1252 T-1 ||  || March 25, 1971 || Palomar || PLS || V || align=right | 3.5 km || 
|-id=251 bgcolor=#fefefe
| 10251 Mulisch || 3089 T-1 ||  || March 26, 1971 || Palomar || PLS || — || align=right | 2.4 km || 
|-id=252 bgcolor=#d6d6d6
| 10252 Heidigraf || 4164 T-1 ||  || March 26, 1971 || Palomar || PLS || KOR || align=right | 5.8 km || 
|-id=253 bgcolor=#fefefe
| 10253 Westerwald || 2116 T-2 ||  || September 29, 1973 || Palomar || PLS || — || align=right | 2.3 km || 
|-id=254 bgcolor=#fefefe
| 10254 Hunsrück || 2314 T-2 ||  || September 29, 1973 || Palomar || PLS || — || align=right | 4.2 km || 
|-id=255 bgcolor=#fefefe
| 10255 Taunus || 3398 T-3 ||  || October 16, 1977 || Palomar || PLS || — || align=right | 3.2 km || 
|-id=256 bgcolor=#fefefe
| 10256 Vredevoogd || 4157 T-3 ||  || October 16, 1977 || Palomar || PLS || FLO || align=right | 3.4 km || 
|-id=257 bgcolor=#d6d6d6
| 10257 Garecynthia || 4333 T-3 ||  || October 16, 1977 || Palomar || PLS || 7:4 || align=right | 14 km || 
|-id=258 bgcolor=#d6d6d6
| 10258 Sárneczky || 1940 AB ||  || January 6, 1940 || Konkoly || G. Kulin || — || align=right | 14 km || 
|-id=259 bgcolor=#d6d6d6
| 10259 Osipovyurij || 1972 HL ||  || April 18, 1972 || Nauchnij || T. M. Smirnova || — || align=right | 22 km || 
|-id=260 bgcolor=#E9E9E9
| 10260 || 1972 TC || — || October 4, 1972 || Hamburg-Bergedorf || L. Kohoutek || EUN || align=right | 6.3 km || 
|-id=261 bgcolor=#fefefe
| 10261 Nikdollezhalʹ ||  ||  || August 22, 1974 || Nauchnij || L. V. Zhuravleva || — || align=right | 12 km || 
|-id=262 bgcolor=#E9E9E9
| 10262 Samoilov ||  ||  || October 3, 1975 || Nauchnij || L. I. Chernykh || EUN || align=right | 11 km || 
|-id=263 bgcolor=#E9E9E9
| 10263 Vadimsimona ||  ||  || September 24, 1976 || Nauchnij || N. S. Chernykh || — || align=right | 16 km || 
|-id=264 bgcolor=#d6d6d6
| 10264 Marov ||  ||  || August 8, 1978 || Nauchnij || N. S. Chernykh || THM || align=right | 13 km || 
|-id=265 bgcolor=#d6d6d6
| 10265 Gunnarsson ||  ||  || September 2, 1978 || La Silla || C.-I. Lagerkvist || — || align=right | 6.9 km || 
|-id=266 bgcolor=#E9E9E9
| 10266 Vladishukhov ||  ||  || September 26, 1978 || Nauchnij || L. V. Zhuravleva || DOR || align=right | 10 km || 
|-id=267 bgcolor=#d6d6d6
| 10267 Giuppone ||  ||  || November 7, 1978 || Palomar || E. F. Helin, S. J. Bus || KOR || align=right | 5.1 km || 
|-id=268 bgcolor=#fefefe
| 10268 ||  || — || April 26, 1979 || Bickley || Perth Obs. || — || align=right | 2.9 km || 
|-id=269 bgcolor=#d6d6d6
| 10269 Tusi ||  ||  || September 24, 1979 || Nauchnij || N. S. Chernykh || THM || align=right | 16 km || 
|-id=270 bgcolor=#fefefe
| 10270 Skoglöv ||  ||  || March 16, 1980 || La Silla || C.-I. Lagerkvist || V || align=right | 2.7 km || 
|-id=271 bgcolor=#fefefe
| 10271 ||  || — || October 14, 1980 || Haute-Provence || H. Debehogne, L. Houziaux || — || align=right | 4.0 km || 
|-id=272 bgcolor=#E9E9E9
| 10272 Yuko ||  ||  || March 1, 1981 || Siding Spring || S. J. Bus || — || align=right | 4.0 km || 
|-id=273 bgcolor=#fefefe
| 10273 Katvolk ||  ||  || March 1, 1981 || Siding Spring || S. J. Bus || — || align=right | 2.7 km || 
|-id=274 bgcolor=#E9E9E9
| 10274 Larryevans ||  ||  || March 1, 1981 || Siding Spring || S. J. Bus || — || align=right | 6.0 km || 
|-id=275 bgcolor=#fefefe
| 10275 Nathankaib ||  ||  || March 1, 1981 || Siding Spring || S. J. Bus || — || align=right | 6.7 km || 
|-id=276 bgcolor=#fefefe
| 10276 Matney ||  ||  || March 3, 1981 || Siding Spring || S. J. Bus || NYS || align=right | 5.7 km || 
|-id=277 bgcolor=#E9E9E9
| 10277 Micheli ||  ||  || March 2, 1981 || Siding Spring || S. J. Bus || — || align=right | 8.8 km || 
|-id=278 bgcolor=#fefefe
| 10278 Virkki ||  ||  || March 2, 1981 || Siding Spring || S. J. Bus || — || align=right | 2.6 km || 
|-id=279 bgcolor=#fefefe
| 10279 Rhiannonblaauw ||  ||  || March 2, 1981 || Siding Spring || S. J. Bus || NYS || align=right | 2.3 km || 
|-id=280 bgcolor=#fefefe
| 10280 Yequanzhi ||  ||  || March 2, 1981 || Siding Spring || S. J. Bus || NYS || align=right | 2.1 km || 
|-id=281 bgcolor=#E9E9E9
| 10281 Libourel ||  ||  || March 11, 1981 || Siding Spring || S. J. Bus || — || align=right | 12 km || 
|-id=282 bgcolor=#E9E9E9
| 10282 Emilykramer ||  ||  || March 2, 1981 || Siding Spring || S. J. Bus || HEN || align=right | 3.1 km || 
|-id=283 bgcolor=#fefefe
| 10283 Cromer ||  ||  || May 5, 1981 || Palomar || C. S. Shoemaker || NYS || align=right | 4.7 km || 
|-id=284 bgcolor=#d6d6d6
| 10284 Damienlemay ||  || — || August 24, 1981 || La Silla || H. Debehogne || KOR || align=right | 6.8 km || 
|-id=285 bgcolor=#fefefe
| 10285 Renémichelsen ||  ||  || August 17, 1982 || La Silla || C.-I. Lagerkvist || V || align=right | 3.9 km || 
|-id=286 bgcolor=#fefefe
| 10286 Shnollia ||  ||  || September 16, 1982 || Nauchnij || L. I. Chernykh || V || align=right | 4.2 km || 
|-id=287 bgcolor=#fefefe
| 10287 Smale ||  ||  || October 21, 1982 || Nauchnij || L. G. Karachkina || — || align=right | 11 km || 
|-id=288 bgcolor=#fefefe
| 10288 Saville || 1983 WN ||  || November 28, 1983 || Anderson Mesa || E. Bowell || — || align=right | 8.6 km || 
|-id=289 bgcolor=#d6d6d6
| 10289 Geoffperry || 1984 QS ||  || August 24, 1984 || Harvard Observatory || Oak Ridge Observatory || — || align=right | 11 km || 
|-id=290 bgcolor=#fefefe
| 10290 Kettering || 1985 SR ||  || September 17, 1985 || Harvard Observatory || Oak Ridge Observatory || NYS || align=right | 4.1 km || 
|-id=291 bgcolor=#d6d6d6
| 10291 || 1985 UT || — || October 20, 1985 || Kleť || A. Mrkos || — || align=right | 22 km || 
|-id=292 bgcolor=#fefefe
| 10292 || 1986 PM || — || August 2, 1986 || Palomar || INAS || FLO || align=right | 4.3 km || 
|-id=293 bgcolor=#d6d6d6
| 10293 Pribina ||  ||  || October 5, 1986 || Piwnice || M. Antal || EOS || align=right | 11 km || 
|-id=294 bgcolor=#fefefe
| 10294 ||  || — || January 14, 1988 || Kleť || A. Mrkos || — || align=right | 3.5 km || 
|-id=295 bgcolor=#FA8072
| 10295 Hippolyta || 1988 GB ||  || April 12, 1988 || Palomar || C. S. Shoemaker, E. M. Shoemaker || — || align=right | 1.4 km || 
|-id=296 bgcolor=#d6d6d6
| 10296 Rominadisisto ||  ||  || September 14, 1988 || Cerro Tololo || S. J. Bus || 3:2 || align=right | 14 km || 
|-id=297 bgcolor=#E9E9E9
| 10297 Lynnejones ||  ||  || September 14, 1988 || Cerro Tololo || S. J. Bus || — || align=right | 5.0 km || 
|-id=298 bgcolor=#E9E9E9
| 10298 Jiangchuanhuang ||  ||  || September 16, 1988 || Cerro Tololo || S. J. Bus || — || align=right | 7.9 km || 
|-id=299 bgcolor=#E9E9E9
| 10299 ||  || — || November 13, 1988 || Gekko || Y. Oshima || ADE || align=right | 12 km || 
|-id=300 bgcolor=#fefefe
| 10300 Tanakadate ||  ||  || March 6, 1989 || Geisei || T. Seki || FLO || align=right | 3.4 km || 
|}

10301–10400 

|-bgcolor=#fefefe
| 10301 Kataoka || 1989 FH ||  || March 30, 1989 || Kitami || K. Endate, K. Watanabe || — || align=right | 3.2 km || 
|-id=302 bgcolor=#FFC2E0
| 10302 || 1989 ML || — || June 29, 1989 || Palomar || E. F. Helin, J. Alu || AMO || align=right data-sort-value="0.47" | 470 m || 
|-id=303 bgcolor=#fefefe
| 10303 Fréret ||  ||  || September 2, 1989 || Haute-Provence || E. W. Elst || NYS || align=right | 3.4 km || 
|-id=304 bgcolor=#E9E9E9
| 10304 Iwaki || 1989 SY ||  || September 30, 1989 || Kitami || K. Endate, K. Watanabe || — || align=right | 5.6 km || 
|-id=305 bgcolor=#E9E9E9
| 10305 Grignard ||  ||  || December 29, 1989 || Haute-Provence || E. W. Elst || — || align=right | 11 km || 
|-id=306 bgcolor=#d6d6d6
| 10306 Pagnol || 1990 QY ||  || August 21, 1990 || Haute Provence || E. W. Elst || — || align=right | 9.9 km || 
|-id=307 bgcolor=#fefefe
| 10307 ||  || — || August 22, 1990 || Palomar || H. E. Holt || — || align=right | 2.9 km || 
|-id=308 bgcolor=#fefefe
| 10308 ||  || — || August 28, 1990 || Palomar || H. E. Holt || — || align=right | 3.0 km || 
|-id=309 bgcolor=#fefefe
| 10309 ||  || — || August 23, 1990 || Palomar || H. E. Holt || — || align=right | 3.1 km || 
|-id=310 bgcolor=#fefefe
| 10310 Delacroix ||  ||  || August 16, 1990 || La Silla || E. W. Elst || — || align=right | 7.0 km || 
|-id=311 bgcolor=#d6d6d6
| 10311 Fantin-Latour ||  ||  || August 16, 1990 || La Silla || E. W. Elst || KOR || align=right | 6.1 km || 
|-id=312 bgcolor=#fefefe
| 10312 ||  || — || August 23, 1990 || Palomar || H. E. Holt || — || align=right | 3.8 km || 
|-id=313 bgcolor=#fefefe
| 10313 Vanessa-Mae ||  ||  || August 26, 1990 || Nauchnij || L. V. Zhuravleva || FLO || align=right | 2.6 km || 
|-id=314 bgcolor=#d6d6d6
| 10314 || 1990 RF || — || September 14, 1990 || Palomar || H. E. Holt || URS || align=right | 22 km || 
|-id=315 bgcolor=#fefefe
| 10315 Brewster ||  ||  || September 23, 1990 || Palomar || E. F. Helin || PHO || align=right | 4.4 km || 
|-id=316 bgcolor=#d6d6d6
| 10316 Williamturner ||  ||  || September 22, 1990 || La Silla || E. W. Elst || HYG || align=right | 13 km || 
|-id=317 bgcolor=#fefefe
| 10317 ||  || — || September 17, 1990 || Palomar || H. E. Holt || FLO || align=right | 4.1 km || 
|-id=318 bgcolor=#fefefe
| 10318 Sumaura || 1990 TX ||  || October 15, 1990 || Minami-Oda || T. Nomura, K. Kawanishi || — || align=right | 3.9 km || 
|-id=319 bgcolor=#fefefe
| 10319 Toshiharu ||  ||  || October 11, 1990 || Kitami || A. Takahashi, K. Watanabe || — || align=right | 3.8 km || 
|-id=320 bgcolor=#fefefe
| 10320 Reiland ||  ||  || October 14, 1990 || Palomar || E. F. Helin || V || align=right | 2.8 km || 
|-id=321 bgcolor=#fefefe
| 10321 Rampo ||  ||  || October 26, 1990 || Geisei || T. Seki || — || align=right | 3.9 km || 
|-id=322 bgcolor=#fefefe
| 10322 Mayuminarita ||  ||  || November 11, 1990 || Kitami || K. Endate, K. Watanabe || NYS || align=right | 3.1 km || 
|-id=323 bgcolor=#fefefe
| 10323 Frazer ||  ||  || November 14, 1990 || La Silla || E. W. Elst || — || align=right | 3.7 km || 
|-id=324 bgcolor=#fefefe
| 10324 Vladimirov ||  ||  || November 14, 1990 || Nauchnij || L. G. Karachkina || NYS || align=right | 3.3 km || 
|-id=325 bgcolor=#fefefe
| 10325 Bexa ||  ||  || November 18, 1990 || La Silla || E. W. Elst || — || align=right | 4.4 km || 
|-id=326 bgcolor=#fefefe
| 10326 Kuragano ||  ||  || November 21, 1990 || Kitami || K. Endate, K. Watanabe || NYS || align=right | 4.4 km || 
|-id=327 bgcolor=#fefefe
| 10327 Batens ||  ||  || November 21, 1990 || La Silla || E. W. Elst || — || align=right | 2.8 km || 
|-id=328 bgcolor=#E9E9E9
| 10328 ||  || — || April 10, 1991 || Palomar || E. F. Helin || — || align=right | 8.8 km || 
|-id=329 bgcolor=#E9E9E9
| 10329 ||  || — || April 11, 1991 || Kushiro || S. Ueda, H. Kaneda || EUN || align=right | 6.1 km || 
|-id=330 bgcolor=#E9E9E9
| 10330 Durkheim ||  ||  || April 8, 1991 || La Silla || E. W. Elst || — || align=right | 4.8 km || 
|-id=331 bgcolor=#d6d6d6
| 10331 Peterbluhm ||  ||  || April 9, 1991 || Tautenburg Observatory || F. Börngen || 3:2slow || align=right | 20 km || 
|-id=332 bgcolor=#E9E9E9
| 10332 Défi ||  ||  || May 13, 1991 || Palomar || C. S. Shoemaker, D. H. Levy || — || align=right | 7.0 km || 
|-id=333 bgcolor=#d6d6d6
| 10333 Portnoff ||  || — || July 12, 1991 || La Silla || H. Debehogne || — || align=right | 8.5 km || 
|-id=334 bgcolor=#d6d6d6
| 10334 Gibbon ||  ||  || August 3, 1991 || La Silla || E. W. Elst || — || align=right | 7.2 km || 
|-id=335 bgcolor=#E9E9E9
| 10335 ||  || — || August 15, 1991 || Palomar || E. F. Helin || GEF || align=right | 4.5 km || 
|-id=336 bgcolor=#d6d6d6
| 10336 ||  || — || August 7, 1991 || Palomar || H. E. Holt || EMA || align=right | 12 km || 
|-id=337 bgcolor=#d6d6d6
| 10337 ||  || — || September 10, 1991 || Dynic || A. Sugie || — || align=right | 8.5 km || 
|-id=338 bgcolor=#d6d6d6
| 10338 ||  || — || September 10, 1991 || Palomar || H. E. Holt || THM || align=right | 13 km || 
|-id=339 bgcolor=#E9E9E9
| 10339 ||  || — || September 11, 1991 || Palomar || H. E. Holt || — || align=right | 4.9 km || 
|-id=340 bgcolor=#d6d6d6
| 10340 Jostjahn ||  ||  || September 10, 1991 || Tautenburg Observatory || F. Börngen || KOR || align=right | 7.0 km || 
|-id=341 bgcolor=#d6d6d6
| 10341 ||  || — || September 16, 1991 || Palomar || H. E. Holt || KOR || align=right | 6.2 km || 
|-id=342 bgcolor=#d6d6d6
| 10342 || 1991 TQ || — || October 1, 1991 || Siding Spring || R. H. McNaught || — || align=right | 8.3 km || 
|-id=343 bgcolor=#d6d6d6
| 10343 Church ||  ||  || November 4, 1991 || Kitt Peak || Spacewatch || THM || align=right | 10 km || 
|-id=344 bgcolor=#fefefe
| 10344 ||  || — || February 12, 1992 || Mérida || O. A. Naranjo, J. Stock || — || align=right | 3.7 km || 
|-id=345 bgcolor=#fefefe
| 10345 ||  || — || February 29, 1992 || La Silla || UESAC || — || align=right | 2.1 km || 
|-id=346 bgcolor=#fefefe
| 10346 Triathlon ||  ||  || April 2, 1992 || Palomar || C. S. Shoemaker, D. H. Levy || PHO || align=right | 3.8 km || 
|-id=347 bgcolor=#fefefe
| 10347 Murom ||  ||  || April 23, 1992 || La Silla || E. W. Elst || — || align=right | 3.7 km || 
|-id=348 bgcolor=#fefefe
| 10348 Poelchau ||  ||  || April 29, 1992 || Tautenburg Observatory || F. Börngen || — || align=right | 4.9 km || 
|-id=349 bgcolor=#fefefe
| 10349 || 1992 LN || — || June 3, 1992 || Palomar || G. J. Leonard || V || align=right | 4.2 km || 
|-id=350 bgcolor=#E9E9E9
| 10350 Spallanzani ||  ||  || July 26, 1992 || La Silla || E. W. Elst || — || align=right | 9.4 km || 
|-id=351 bgcolor=#E9E9E9
| 10351 Seiichisato ||  ||  || September 23, 1992 || Kitami || K. Endate, K. Watanabe || EUN || align=right | 9.4 km || 
|-id=352 bgcolor=#E9E9E9
| 10352 Kawamura ||  ||  || October 26, 1992 || Kitami || K. Endate, K. Watanabe || — || align=right | 6.8 km || 
|-id=353 bgcolor=#d6d6d6
| 10353 Momotaro ||  ||  || December 20, 1992 || Kiyosato || S. Otomo || KOR || align=right | 8.4 km || 
|-id=354 bgcolor=#d6d6d6
| 10354 Guillaumebudé ||  ||  || January 27, 1993 || Caussols || E. W. Elst || — || align=right | 13 km || 
|-id=355 bgcolor=#fefefe
| 10355 Kojiroharada || 1993 EQ ||  || March 15, 1993 || Kitami || K. Endate, K. Watanabe || V || align=right | 4.4 km || 
|-id=356 bgcolor=#E9E9E9
| 10356 Rudolfsteiner ||  ||  || September 15, 1993 || La Silla || E. W. Elst || — || align=right | 8.1 km || 
|-id=357 bgcolor=#fefefe
| 10357 ||  || — || September 19, 1993 || Palomar || H. E. Holt || PHO || align=right | 7.2 km || 
|-id=358 bgcolor=#fefefe
| 10358 Kirchhoff ||  ||  || October 9, 1993 || La Silla || E. W. Elst || NYS || align=right | 4.5 km || 
|-id=359 bgcolor=#fefefe
| 10359 ||  || — || October 13, 1993 || Palomar || H. E. Holt || — || align=right | 6.2 km || 
|-id=360 bgcolor=#fefefe
| 10360 || 1993 VN || — || November 7, 1993 || Kushiro || S. Ueda, H. Kaneda || NYS || align=right | 3.3 km || 
|-id=361 bgcolor=#fefefe
| 10361 Bunsen ||  ||  || August 12, 1994 || La Silla || E. W. Elst || FLO || align=right | 2.4 km || 
|-id=362 bgcolor=#fefefe
| 10362 ||  || — || October 31, 1994 || Kushiro || S. Ueda, H. Kaneda || — || align=right | 2.7 km || 
|-id=363 bgcolor=#fefefe
| 10363 ||  || — || October 31, 1994 || Palomar || PCAS || — || align=right | 3.9 km || 
|-id=364 bgcolor=#fefefe
| 10364 Tainai ||  ||  || November 3, 1994 || Ōizumi || T. Kobayashi || — || align=right | 3.0 km || 
|-id=365 bgcolor=#fefefe
| 10365 Kurokawa ||  ||  || November 27, 1994 || Ōizumi || T. Kobayashi || — || align=right | 2.5 km || 
|-id=366 bgcolor=#fefefe
| 10366 Shozosato ||  ||  || November 24, 1994 || Kitami || K. Endate, K. Watanabe || — || align=right | 4.0 km || 
|-id=367 bgcolor=#fefefe
| 10367 Sayo ||  ||  || December 31, 1994 || Ōizumi || T. Kobayashi || — || align=right | 3.7 km || 
|-id=368 bgcolor=#fefefe
| 10368 Kozuki ||  ||  || February 7, 1995 || Ōizumi || T. Kobayashi || — || align=right | 5.4 km || 
|-id=369 bgcolor=#E9E9E9
| 10369 Sinden ||  ||  || February 8, 1995 || Siding Spring || D. J. Asher || BRU || align=right | 13 km || 
|-id=370 bgcolor=#C7FF8F
| 10370 Hylonome ||  ||  || February 27, 1995 || Mauna Kea || D. C. Jewitt, J. X. Luu || centaurcritical || align=right | 84 km || 
|-id=371 bgcolor=#fefefe
| 10371 Gigli ||  ||  || February 27, 1995 || San Marcello || L. Tesi, A. Boattini || — || align=right | 1.6 km || 
|-id=372 bgcolor=#E9E9E9
| 10372 Moran ||  ||  || March 26, 1995 || Kitt Peak || Spacewatch || — || align=right | 8.9 km || 
|-id=373 bgcolor=#fefefe
| 10373 MacRobert || 1996 ER ||  || March 14, 1996 || Sudbury || D. di Cicco || — || align=right | 2.7 km || 
|-id=374 bgcolor=#fefefe
| 10374 Etampes ||  ||  || April 15, 1996 || La Silla || E. W. Elst || slow || align=right | 4.8 km || 
|-id=375 bgcolor=#fefefe
| 10375 Michiokuga ||  ||  || April 21, 1996 || Kuma Kogen || A. Nakamura || NYS || align=right | 3.7 km || 
|-id=376 bgcolor=#E9E9E9
| 10376 Chiarini || 1996 KW ||  || May 16, 1996 || Bologna || San Vittore Obs. || — || align=right | 5.7 km || 
|-id=377 bgcolor=#d6d6d6
| 10377 Kilimanjaro ||  ||  || July 14, 1996 || La Silla || E. W. Elst || THM || align=right | 8.2 km || 
|-id=378 bgcolor=#d6d6d6
| 10378 Ingmarbergman ||  ||  || July 14, 1996 || La Silla || E. W. Elst || KOR || align=right | 6.0 km || 
|-id=379 bgcolor=#d6d6d6
| 10379 Lake Placid || 1996 OH ||  || July 18, 1996 || Rand || G. R. Viscome || 7:4 || align=right | 11 km || 
|-id=380 bgcolor=#d6d6d6
| 10380 Berwald ||  ||  || August 8, 1996 || La Silla || E. W. Elst || KOR || align=right | 4.4 km || 
|-id=381 bgcolor=#d6d6d6
| 10381 Malinsmith || 1996 RB ||  || September 3, 1996 || Stakenbridge || B. G. W. Manning || YAK || align=right | 9.6 km || 
|-id=382 bgcolor=#fefefe
| 10382 Hadamard ||  ||  || September 15, 1996 || Prescott || P. G. Comba || — || align=right | 4.1 km || 
|-id=383 bgcolor=#E9E9E9
| 10383 ||  || — || September 16, 1996 || Church Stretton || S. P. Laurie || — || align=right | 6.5 km || 
|-id=384 bgcolor=#d6d6d6
| 10384 ||  || — || October 9, 1996 || Kushiro || S. Ueda, H. Kaneda || EOS || align=right | 8.5 km || 
|-id=385 bgcolor=#E9E9E9
| 10385 Amaterasu ||  ||  || October 15, 1996 || Nachi-Katsuura || Y. Shimizu, T. Urata || EUN || align=right | 8.6 km || 
|-id=386 bgcolor=#d6d6d6
| 10386 Romulus ||  ||  || October 12, 1996 || Colleverde || V. S. Casulli || ALA || align=right | 16 km || 
|-id=387 bgcolor=#E9E9E9
| 10387 Bepicolombo || 1996 UQ ||  || October 18, 1996 || Sormano || P. Sicoli, F. Manca || — || align=right | 7.9 km || 
|-id=388 bgcolor=#d6d6d6
| 10388 Zhuguangya ||  ||  || December 25, 1996 || Xinglong || SCAP || URS || align=right | 22 km || 
|-id=389 bgcolor=#fefefe
| 10389 Robmanning || 1997 LD ||  || June 1, 1997 || Haleakalā || NEAT || FLO || align=right | 5.0 km || 
|-id=390 bgcolor=#fefefe
| 10390 Lenka ||  ||  || August 27, 1997 || Ondřejov || P. Pravec, M. Wolf || slow? || align=right | 2.7 km || 
|-id=391 bgcolor=#E9E9E9
| 10391 ||  || — || September 5, 1997 || Nachi-Katsuura || Y. Shimizu, T. Urata || EUN || align=right | 8.0 km || 
|-id=392 bgcolor=#fefefe
| 10392 Brace ||  ||  || September 11, 1997 || Lime Creek || R. Linderholm || — || align=right | 4.7 km || 
|-id=393 bgcolor=#E9E9E9
| 10393 ||  || — || September 4, 1997 || Gekko || T. Kagawa, T. Urata || — || align=right | 7.4 km || 
|-id=394 bgcolor=#E9E9E9
| 10394 ||  || — || September 22, 1997 || Giesing || P. Sala || EUN || align=right | 6.6 km || 
|-id=395 bgcolor=#fefefe
| 10395 Jirkahorn ||  ||  || September 23, 1997 || Ondřejov || M. Wolf, P. Pravec || — || align=right | 7.6 km || 
|-id=396 bgcolor=#d6d6d6
| 10396 ||  || — || September 17, 1997 || Xinglong || SCAP || HYG || align=right | 12 km || 
|-id=397 bgcolor=#d6d6d6
| 10397 ||  || — || September 17, 1997 || Xinglong || SCAP || THM || align=right | 8.8 km || 
|-id=398 bgcolor=#fefefe
| 10398 ||  || — || October 23, 1997 || Kushiro || S. Ueda, H. Kaneda || — || align=right | 4.5 km || 
|-id=399 bgcolor=#fefefe
| 10399 Nishiharima ||  ||  || October 29, 1997 || Ōizumi || T. Kobayashi || — || align=right | 5.2 km || 
|-id=400 bgcolor=#fefefe
| 10400 Hakkaisan || 1997 VX ||  || November 1, 1997 || Ōizumi || T. Kobayashi || — || align=right | 6.1 km || 
|}

10401–10500 

|-bgcolor=#E9E9E9
| 10401 Masakoba ||  ||  || November 6, 1997 || Ōizumi || T. Kobayashi || — || align=right | 4.5 km || 
|-id=402 bgcolor=#d6d6d6
| 10402 ||  || — || November 8, 1997 || Ōizumi || T. Kobayashi || — || align=right | 7.9 km || 
|-id=403 bgcolor=#fefefe
| 10403 Marcelgrün ||  ||  || November 22, 1997 || Kleť || J. Tichá, M. Tichý || FLO || align=right | 3.6 km || 
|-id=404 bgcolor=#d6d6d6
| 10404 McCall ||  ||  || November 22, 1997 || Kitt Peak || Spacewatch || slow || align=right | 9.5 km || 
|-id=405 bgcolor=#fefefe
| 10405 Yoshiaki ||  ||  || November 19, 1997 || Nanyo || T. Okuni || NYS || align=right | 2.7 km || 
|-id=406 bgcolor=#d6d6d6
| 10406 ||  || — || November 24, 1997 || Kushiro || S. Ueda, H. Kaneda || — || align=right | 8.1 km || 
|-id=407 bgcolor=#fefefe
| 10407 ||  || — || November 29, 1997 || Socorro || LINEAR || — || align=right | 3.1 km || 
|-id=408 bgcolor=#d6d6d6
| 10408 ||  || — || November 29, 1997 || Socorro || LINEAR || THM || align=right | 8.6 km || 
|-id=409 bgcolor=#d6d6d6
| 10409 ||  || — || November 29, 1997 || Socorro || LINEAR || THM || align=right | 11 km || 
|-id=410 bgcolor=#d6d6d6
| 10410 Yangguanghua ||  ||  || December 4, 1997 || Xinglong || SCAP || — || align=right | 11 km || 
|-id=411 bgcolor=#fefefe
| 10411 ||  || — || December 15, 1997 || Xinglong || SCAP || V || align=right | 3.2 km || 
|-id=412 bgcolor=#d6d6d6
| 10412 Tsukuyomi ||  ||  || December 21, 1997 || Nachi-Katsuura || Y. Shimizu, T. Urata || EOS || align=right | 9.8 km || 
|-id=413 bgcolor=#d6d6d6
| 10413 Pansecchi ||  ||  || December 29, 1997 || Bologna || San Vittore Obs. || EOS || align=right | 8.4 km || 
|-id=414 bgcolor=#d6d6d6
| 10414 ||  || — || August 17, 1998 || Socorro || LINEAR || VER || align=right | 14 km || 
|-id=415 bgcolor=#d6d6d6
| 10415 Mali Lošinj ||  ||  || October 23, 1998 || Višnjan Observatory || K. Korlević || slow || align=right | 14 km || 
|-id=416 bgcolor=#FA8072
| 10416 Kottler ||  ||  || November 14, 1998 || Socorro || LINEAR || — || align=right | 3.2 km || 
|-id=417 bgcolor=#d6d6d6
| 10417 ||  || — || November 18, 1998 || Socorro || LINEAR || THM || align=right | 12 km || 
|-id=418 bgcolor=#fefefe
| 10418 ||  || — || November 25, 1998 || Socorro || LINEAR || V || align=right | 6.2 km || 
|-id=419 bgcolor=#fefefe
| 10419 ||  || — || December 11, 1998 || Ōizumi || T. Kobayashi || FLO || align=right | 5.6 km || 
|-id=420 bgcolor=#d6d6d6
| 10420 ||  || — || December 27, 1998 || Ōizumi || T. Kobayashi || — || align=right | 14 km || 
|-id=421 bgcolor=#fefefe
| 10421 Dalmatin ||  ||  || January 9, 1999 || Višnjan Observatory || K. Korlević || NYS || align=right | 6.1 km || 
|-id=422 bgcolor=#d6d6d6
| 10422 ||  || — || January 14, 1999 || Xinglong || SCAP || 627 || align=right | 21 km || 
|-id=423 bgcolor=#fefefe
| 10423 Dajčić || 1999 BB ||  || January 16, 1999 || Višnjan Observatory || K. Korlević || — || align=right | 3.2 km || 
|-id=424 bgcolor=#fefefe
| 10424 Gaillard ||  ||  || January 20, 1999 || Caussols || ODAS || NYS || align=right | 6.6 km || 
|-id=425 bgcolor=#E9E9E9
| 10425 Landfermann ||  ||  || January 20, 1999 || Caussols || ODAS || — || align=right | 3.8 km || 
|-id=426 bgcolor=#E9E9E9
| 10426 Charlierouse ||  ||  || January 16, 1999 || Kitt Peak || Spacewatch || EUN || align=right | 9.2 km || 
|-id=427 bgcolor=#fefefe
| 10427 Klinkenberg || 2017 P-L ||  || September 24, 1960 || Palomar || PLS || — || align=right | 2.8 km || 
|-id=428 bgcolor=#E9E9E9
| 10428 Wanders || 2073 P-L ||  || September 24, 1960 || Palomar || PLS || — || align=right | 2.2 km || 
|-id=429 bgcolor=#E9E9E9
| 10429 van Woerden || 2546 P-L ||  || September 24, 1960 || Palomar || PLS || MAR || align=right | 4.3 km || 
|-id=430 bgcolor=#E9E9E9
| 10430 Martschmidt || 4030 P-L ||  || September 24, 1960 || Palomar || PLS || — || align=right | 5.7 km || 
|-id=431 bgcolor=#E9E9E9
| 10431 Pottasch || 4042 P-L ||  || September 24, 1960 || Palomar || PLS || — || align=right | 3.1 km || 
|-id=432 bgcolor=#fefefe
| 10432 Ullischwarz || 4623 P-L ||  || September 24, 1960 || Palomar || PLS || FLO || align=right | 3.5 km || 
|-id=433 bgcolor=#E9E9E9
| 10433 Ponsen || 4716 P-L ||  || September 24, 1960 || Palomar || PLS || — || align=right | 3.6 km || 
|-id=434 bgcolor=#fefefe
| 10434 Tinbergen || 4722 P-L ||  || September 24, 1960 || Palomar || PLS || NYS || align=right | 3.4 km || 
|-id=435 bgcolor=#E9E9E9
| 10435 Tjeerd || 6064 P-L ||  || September 24, 1960 || Palomar || PLS || — || align=right | 5.7 km || 
|-id=436 bgcolor=#E9E9E9
| 10436 Janwillempel || 6073 P-L ||  || September 24, 1960 || Palomar || PLS || — || align=right | 3.8 km || 
|-id=437 bgcolor=#fefefe
| 10437 van der Kruit || 6085 P-L ||  || September 24, 1960 || Palomar || PLS || NYS || align=right | 2.7 km || 
|-id=438 bgcolor=#fefefe
| 10438 Ludolph || 6615 P-L ||  || September 24, 1960 || Palomar || PLS || FLO || align=right | 3.8 km || 
|-id=439 bgcolor=#d6d6d6
| 10439 van Schooten || 6676 P-L ||  || September 24, 1960 || Palomar || PLS || — || align=right | 8.1 km || 
|-id=440 bgcolor=#fefefe
| 10440 van Swinden || 7636 P-L ||  || October 17, 1960 || Palomar || PLS || — || align=right | 2.2 km || 
|-id=441 bgcolor=#E9E9E9
| 10441 van Rijckevorsel || 9076 P-L ||  || October 17, 1960 || Palomar || PLS || EUN || align=right | 6.6 km || 
|-id=442 bgcolor=#d6d6d6
| 10442 Biezenzo || 4062 T-1 ||  || March 26, 1971 || Palomar || PLS || — || align=right | 16 km || 
|-id=443 bgcolor=#fefefe
| 10443 van der Pol || 1045 T-2 ||  || September 29, 1973 || Palomar || PLS || — || align=right | 3.4 km || 
|-id=444 bgcolor=#d6d6d6
| 10444 de Hevesy || 3290 T-2 ||  || September 30, 1973 || Palomar || PLS || — || align=right | 13 km || 
|-id=445 bgcolor=#fefefe
| 10445 Coster || 4090 T-2 ||  || September 29, 1973 || Palomar || PLS || NYS || align=right | 3.1 km || 
|-id=446 bgcolor=#fefefe
| 10446 Siegbahn || 3006 T-3 ||  || October 16, 1977 || Palomar || PLS || — || align=right | 8.8 km || 
|-id=447 bgcolor=#d6d6d6
| 10447 Bloembergen || 3357 T-3 ||  || October 16, 1977 || Palomar || PLS || KOR || align=right | 6.4 km || 
|-id=448 bgcolor=#d6d6d6
| 10448 Schawlow || 4314 T-3 ||  || October 16, 1977 || Palomar || PLS || KOR || align=right | 6.1 km || 
|-id=449 bgcolor=#d6d6d6
| 10449 Takuma || 1936 UD ||  || October 16, 1936 || Nice || M. Laugier || — || align=right | 13 km || 
|-id=450 bgcolor=#fefefe
| 10450 Girard || 1967 JQ ||  || May 6, 1967 || El Leoncito || C. U. Cesco, A. R. Klemola || — || align=right | 8.8 km || 
|-id=451 bgcolor=#E9E9E9
| 10451 || 1975 SE || — || September 28, 1975 || Anderson Mesa || H. L. Giclas || — || align=right | 7.7 km || 
|-id=452 bgcolor=#fefefe
| 10452 Zuev ||  ||  || September 25, 1976 || Nauchnij || N. S. Chernykh || FLO || align=right | 4.7 km || 
|-id=453 bgcolor=#d6d6d6
| 10453 Banzan ||  ||  || February 18, 1977 || Kiso || H. Kosai, K. Furukawa || — || align=right | 10 km || 
|-id=454 bgcolor=#fefefe
| 10454 Vallenar || 1978 NY ||  || July 9, 1978 || La Silla || H.-E. Schuster || V || align=right | 3.1 km || 
|-id=455 bgcolor=#fefefe
| 10455 Donnison ||  ||  || July 9, 1978 || Mount Stromlo || C.-I. Lagerkvist || — || align=right | 4.0 km || 
|-id=456 bgcolor=#fefefe
| 10456 Anechka ||  ||  || August 8, 1978 || Nauchnij || N. S. Chernykh || — || align=right | 4.2 km || 
|-id=457 bgcolor=#fefefe
| 10457 Suminov ||  ||  || August 31, 1978 || Nauchnij || N. S. Chernykh || NYS || align=right | 3.0 km || 
|-id=458 bgcolor=#fefefe
| 10458 Sfranke ||  ||  || September 2, 1978 || La Silla || C.-I. Lagerkvist || NYS || align=right | 2.9 km || 
|-id=459 bgcolor=#fefefe
| 10459 Vladichaika ||  ||  || September 27, 1978 || Nauchnij || L. I. Chernykh || — || align=right | 3.8 km || 
|-id=460 bgcolor=#E9E9E9
| 10460 Correa-Otto ||  ||  || November 7, 1978 || Palomar || E. F. Helin, S. J. Bus || — || align=right | 5.0 km || 
|-id=461 bgcolor=#fefefe
| 10461 Dawilliams || 1978 XU ||  || December 6, 1978 || Palomar || E. Bowell, A. Warnock || — || align=right | 5.5 km || 
|-id=462 bgcolor=#fefefe
| 10462 Saxogrammaticus || 1979 KM ||  || May 19, 1979 || La Silla || R. M. West || — || align=right | 2.4 km || 
|-id=463 bgcolor=#d6d6d6
| 10463 Bannister ||  ||  || June 25, 1979 || Siding Spring || E. F. Helin, S. J. Bus || THM || align=right | 11 km || 
|-id=464 bgcolor=#fefefe
| 10464 Jessie || 1979 SC ||  || September 17, 1979 || Harvard Observatory || Harvard Obs. || FLO || align=right | 3.5 km || 
|-id=465 bgcolor=#d6d6d6
| 10465 Olkin ||  ||  || November 29, 1980 || Palomar || S. J. Bus || — || align=right | 21 km || 
|-id=466 bgcolor=#fefefe
| 10466 Marius-Ioan ||  ||  || March 1, 1981 || Siding Spring || S. J. Bus || — || align=right | 2.6 km || 
|-id=467 bgcolor=#E9E9E9
| 10467 Peterbus ||  ||  || March 1, 1981 || Siding Spring || S. J. Bus || — || align=right | 5.2 km || 
|-id=468 bgcolor=#fefefe
| 10468 Itacuruba ||  ||  || March 1, 1981 || Siding Spring || S. J. Bus || — || align=right | 2.2 km || 
|-id=469 bgcolor=#fefefe
| 10469 Krohn ||  ||  || March 1, 1981 || Siding Spring || S. J. Bus || V || align=right | 2.5 km || 
|-id=470 bgcolor=#fefefe
| 10470 Bartczak ||  ||  || March 2, 1981 || Siding Spring || S. J. Bus || V || align=right | 2.1 km || 
|-id=471 bgcolor=#E9E9E9
| 10471 Marciniak ||  ||  || March 2, 1981 || Siding Spring || S. J. Bus || — || align=right | 4.7 km || 
|-id=472 bgcolor=#fefefe
| 10472 Santana-Ros ||  ||  || March 2, 1981 || Siding Spring || S. J. Bus || NYS || align=right | 3.1 km || 
|-id=473 bgcolor=#E9E9E9
| 10473 Thirouin ||  ||  || March 2, 1981 || Siding Spring || S. J. Bus || HEN || align=right | 8.0 km || 
|-id=474 bgcolor=#E9E9E9
| 10474 Pecina ||  ||  || March 3, 1981 || Siding Spring || S. J. Bus || — || align=right | 3.5 km || 
|-id=475 bgcolor=#fefefe
| 10475 Maxpoilâne ||  ||  || March 1, 1981 || Siding Spring || S. J. Bus || V || align=right | 2.1 km || 
|-id=476 bgcolor=#fefefe
| 10476 Los Molinos ||  ||  || March 2, 1981 || Siding Spring || S. J. Bus || slow || align=right | 2.9 km || 
|-id=477 bgcolor=#fefefe
| 10477 Lacumparsita ||  ||  || March 2, 1981 || Siding Spring || S. J. Bus || — || align=right | 3.0 km || 
|-id=478 bgcolor=#d6d6d6
| 10478 Alsabti || 1981 WO ||  || November 24, 1981 || Anderson Mesa || E. Bowell || EOS || align=right | 11 km || 
|-id=479 bgcolor=#fefefe
| 10479 Yiqunchen || 1982 HJ ||  || April 18, 1982 || Anderson Mesa || M. Watt || — || align=right | 5.2 km || 
|-id=480 bgcolor=#fefefe
| 10480 Jennyblue ||  ||  || May 15, 1982 || Palomar || Palomar Obs. || — || align=right | 3.2 km || 
|-id=481 bgcolor=#fefefe
| 10481 Esipov ||  ||  || August 23, 1982 || Nauchnij || N. S. Chernykh || NYS || align=right | 8.3 km || 
|-id=482 bgcolor=#fefefe
| 10482 Dangrieser ||  ||  || September 14, 1983 || Anderson Mesa || E. Bowell || FLO || align=right | 3.1 km || 
|-id=483 bgcolor=#fefefe
| 10483 Tomburns ||  ||  || September 4, 1983 || Anderson Mesa || E. Bowell || FLO || align=right | 3.5 km || 
|-id=484 bgcolor=#fefefe
| 10484 Hecht || 1983 WM ||  || November 28, 1983 || Anderson Mesa || E. Bowell || V || align=right | 4.6 km || 
|-id=485 bgcolor=#d6d6d6
| 10485 Sarahyeomans ||  ||  || September 21, 1984 || La Silla || H. Debehogne || THM || align=right | 12 km || 
|-id=486 bgcolor=#fefefe
| 10486 ||  || — || February 15, 1985 || La Silla || H. Debehogne || FLO || align=right | 3.1 km || 
|-id=487 bgcolor=#fefefe
| 10487 Danpeterson ||  ||  || April 14, 1985 || Palomar || C. S. Shoemaker, E. M. Shoemaker || PHO || align=right | 5.7 km || 
|-id=488 bgcolor=#fefefe
| 10488 ||  || — || September 12, 1985 || Zimmerwald || P. Wild || NYS || align=right | 4.7 km || 
|-id=489 bgcolor=#d6d6d6
| 10489 Keinonen ||  ||  || October 15, 1985 || Anderson Mesa || E. Bowell || — || align=right | 11 km || 
|-id=490 bgcolor=#d6d6d6
| 10490 || 1985 VL || — || November 14, 1985 || Brorfelde || P. Jensen || — || align=right | 18 km || 
|-id=491 bgcolor=#fefefe
| 10491 ||  || — || August 27, 1986 || La Silla || H. Debehogne || — || align=right | 3.4 km || 
|-id=492 bgcolor=#d6d6d6
| 10492 ||  || — || August 28, 1986 || La Silla || H. Debehogne || — || align=right | 9.7 km || 
|-id=493 bgcolor=#fefefe
| 10493 ||  || — || August 28, 1986 || La Silla || H. Debehogne || V || align=right | 3.1 km || 
|-id=494 bgcolor=#fefefe
| 10494 ||  || — || August 29, 1986 || La Silla || H. Debehogne || NYS || align=right | 3.3 km || 
|-id=495 bgcolor=#E9E9E9
| 10495 || 1986 RD || — || September 8, 1986 || Brorfelde || P. Jensen || DOR || align=right | 12 km || 
|-id=496 bgcolor=#fefefe
| 10496 || 1986 RK || — || September 11, 1986 || Brorfelde || P. Jensen || — || align=right | 5.2 km || 
|-id=497 bgcolor=#fefefe
| 10497 || 1986 RQ || — || September 11, 1986 || Brorfelde || P. Jensen || — || align=right | 6.4 km || 
|-id=498 bgcolor=#fefefe
| 10498 Bobgent ||  ||  || September 11, 1986 || Anderson Mesa || E. Bowell || — || align=right | 2.7 km || 
|-id=499 bgcolor=#fefefe
| 10499 ||  || — || September 7, 1986 || La Silla || H. Debehogne || FLO || align=right | 3.5 km || 
|-id=500 bgcolor=#E9E9E9
| 10500 Nishi-koen || 1987 GA ||  || April 3, 1987 || Ayashi Station || M. Koishikawa || — || align=right | 7.5 km || 
|}

10501–10600 

|-bgcolor=#E9E9E9
| 10501 Ardmacha || 1987 OT ||  || July 19, 1987 || Palomar || E. F. Helin || CLO || align=right | 5.9 km || 
|-id=502 bgcolor=#FA8072
| 10502 Armaghobs ||  ||  || August 22, 1987 || Palomar || E. F. Helin || — || align=right | 2.6 km || 
|-id=503 bgcolor=#fefefe
| 10503 Johnmarks ||  ||  || September 27, 1987 || La Silla || H. Debehogne || FLO || align=right | 4.0 km || 
|-id=504 bgcolor=#E9E9E9
| 10504 Doga ||  ||  || October 22, 1987 || Nauchnij || L. V. Zhuravleva || MRX || align=right | 7.0 km || 
|-id=505 bgcolor=#d6d6d6
| 10505 Johnnycash ||  ||  || January 22, 1988 || La Silla || H. Debehogne || EOS || align=right | 11 km || 
|-id=506 bgcolor=#d6d6d6
| 10506 Rydberg ||  ||  || February 13, 1988 || La Silla || E. W. Elst || — || align=right | 13 km || 
|-id=507 bgcolor=#fefefe
| 10507 ||  || — || March 13, 1988 || Brorfelde || P. Jensen || V || align=right | 4.6 km || 
|-id=508 bgcolor=#fefefe
| 10508 ||  || — || September 1, 1988 || La Silla || H. Debehogne || — || align=right | 6.7 km || 
|-id=509 bgcolor=#d6d6d6
| 10509 Heinrichkayser ||  ||  || April 3, 1989 || La Silla || E. W. Elst || — || align=right | 14 km || 
|-id=510 bgcolor=#fefefe
| 10510 Maxschreier ||  ||  || April 3, 1989 || La Silla || E. W. Elst || FLO || align=right | 2.7 km || 
|-id=511 bgcolor=#E9E9E9
| 10511 || 1989 OD || — || July 21, 1989 || Siding Spring || R. H. McNaught || GEF || align=right | 7.9 km || 
|-id=512 bgcolor=#fefefe
| 10512 Yamandu ||  ||  || October 2, 1989 || Cerro Tololo || S. J. Bus || — || align=right | 10 km || 
|-id=513 bgcolor=#d6d6d6
| 10513 ||  || — || October 2, 1989 || La Silla || H. Debehogne || — || align=right | 18 km || 
|-id=514 bgcolor=#E9E9E9
| 10514 ||  || — || October 4, 1989 || La Silla || H. Debehogne || — || align=right | 15 km || 
|-id=515 bgcolor=#E9E9E9
| 10515 Old Joe ||  ||  || October 31, 1989 || Stakenbridge || B. G. W. Manning || — || align=right | 3.4 km || 
|-id=516 bgcolor=#fefefe
| 10516 Sakurajima || 1989 VQ ||  || November 1, 1989 || Kagoshima || M. Mukai, M. Takeishi || MAS || align=right | 4.0 km || 
|-id=517 bgcolor=#E9E9E9
| 10517 ||  || — || January 28, 1990 || Kushiro || S. Ueda, H. Kaneda || — || align=right | 8.5 km || 
|-id=518 bgcolor=#d6d6d6
| 10518 || 1990 MC || — || June 18, 1990 || Palomar || H. E. Holt || — || align=right | 6.8 km || 
|-id=519 bgcolor=#fefefe
| 10519 ||  || — || September 15, 1990 || Palomar || H. E. Holt || — || align=right | 3.0 km || 
|-id=520 bgcolor=#fefefe
| 10520 ||  || — || September 15, 1990 || Palomar || H. E. Holt || — || align=right | 8.7 km || 
|-id=521 bgcolor=#d6d6d6
| 10521 ||  || — || September 14, 1990 || La Silla || H. Debehogne || — || align=right | 8.6 km || 
|-id=522 bgcolor=#fefefe
| 10522 ||  || — || September 18, 1990 || Palomar || H. E. Holt || — || align=right | 4.5 km || 
|-id=523 bgcolor=#fefefe
| 10523 D'Haveloose ||  ||  || September 22, 1990 || La Silla || E. W. Elst || — || align=right | 5.3 km || 
|-id=524 bgcolor=#fefefe
| 10524 Maniewski ||  ||  || September 22, 1990 || La Silla || E. W. Elst || FLO || align=right | 4.2 km || 
|-id=525 bgcolor=#fefefe
| 10525 || 1990 TO || — || October 12, 1990 || Siding Spring || R. H. McNaught || FLO || align=right | 4.1 km || 
|-id=526 bgcolor=#fefefe
| 10526 Ginkogino ||  ||  || October 19, 1990 || Okutama || T. Hioki, S. Hayakawa || FLO || align=right | 3.0 km || 
|-id=527 bgcolor=#fefefe
| 10527 ||  || — || October 20, 1990 || Dynic || A. Sugie || ERI || align=right | 8.1 km || 
|-id=528 bgcolor=#fefefe
| 10528 ||  || — || November 12, 1990 || Kushiro || S. Ueda, H. Kaneda || NYS || align=right | 3.8 km || 
|-id=529 bgcolor=#fefefe
| 10529 Giessenburg ||  ||  || November 16, 1990 || La Silla || E. W. Elst || — || align=right | 4.2 km || 
|-id=530 bgcolor=#fefefe
| 10530 || 1991 EA || — || March 7, 1991 || Kushiro || S. Ueda, H. Kaneda || V || align=right | 5.1 km || 
|-id=531 bgcolor=#fefefe
| 10531 ||  || — || April 8, 1991 || Palomar || E. F. Helin || H || align=right | 2.1 km || 
|-id=532 bgcolor=#E9E9E9
| 10532 ||  || — || July 14, 1991 || Palomar || H. E. Holt || — || align=right | 8.9 km || 
|-id=533 bgcolor=#E9E9E9
| 10533 ||  || — || August 5, 1991 || Palomar || H. E. Holt || AST || align=right | 11 km || 
|-id=534 bgcolor=#d6d6d6
| 10534 ||  || — || August 7, 1991 || Palomar || H. E. Holt || — || align=right | 6.0 km || 
|-id=535 bgcolor=#E9E9E9
| 10535 ||  || — || September 10, 1991 || Dynic || A. Sugie || — || align=right | 7.9 km || 
|-id=536 bgcolor=#d6d6d6
| 10536 ||  || — || September 11, 1991 || Palomar || H. E. Holt || KOR || align=right | 6.2 km || 
|-id=537 bgcolor=#d6d6d6
| 10537 ||  || — || September 15, 1991 || Palomar || H. E. Holt || — || align=right | 7.9 km || 
|-id=538 bgcolor=#fefefe
| 10538 Torode ||  ||  || November 11, 1991 || Stakenbridge || B. G. W. Manning || — || align=right | 1.6 km || 
|-id=539 bgcolor=#d6d6d6
| 10539 ||  || — || November 9, 1991 || Kushiro || S. Ueda, H. Kaneda || — || align=right | 12 km || 
|-id=540 bgcolor=#d6d6d6
| 10540 Hachigoroh ||  ||  || November 13, 1991 || Kiyosato || S. Otomo || HYG || align=right | 11 km || 
|-id=541 bgcolor=#fefefe
| 10541 Malesherbes || 1991 YX ||  || December 31, 1991 || Haute-Provence || E. W. Elst || FLO || align=right | 4.4 km || 
|-id=542 bgcolor=#fefefe
| 10542 Ruckers ||  ||  || February 2, 1992 || La Silla || E. W. Elst || — || align=right | 7.4 km || 
|-id=543 bgcolor=#fefefe
| 10543 Klee ||  ||  || February 27, 1992 || Tautenburg Observatory || F. Börngen || FLO || align=right | 2.7 km || 
|-id=544 bgcolor=#fefefe
| 10544 Hörsnebara ||  ||  || February 29, 1992 || La Silla || UESAC || — || align=right | 3.8 km || 
|-id=545 bgcolor=#fefefe
| 10545 Källunge ||  ||  || March 2, 1992 || La Silla || UESAC || — || align=right | 2.9 km || 
|-id=546 bgcolor=#fefefe
| 10546 Nakanomakoto ||  ||  || March 28, 1992 || Kitami || K. Endate, K. Watanabe || FLO || align=right | 4.2 km || 
|-id=547 bgcolor=#fefefe
| 10547 Yosakoi || 1992 JF ||  || May 2, 1992 || Geisei || T. Seki || — || align=right | 4.4 km || 
|-id=548 bgcolor=#FA8072
| 10548 ||  || — || August 2, 1992 || Palomar || H. E. Holt || — || align=right | 3.6 km || 
|-id=549 bgcolor=#E9E9E9
| 10549 Helsingborg ||  ||  || September 2, 1992 || La Silla || E. W. Elst || EUN || align=right | 4.2 km || 
|-id=550 bgcolor=#E9E9E9
| 10550 Malmö ||  ||  || September 2, 1992 || La Silla || E. W. Elst || — || align=right | 6.9 km || 
|-id=551 bgcolor=#d6d6d6
| 10551 Göteborg ||  ||  || December 18, 1992 || Caussols || E. W. Elst || EOSslow || align=right | 15 km || 
|-id=552 bgcolor=#d6d6d6
| 10552 Stockholm ||  ||  || January 22, 1993 || La Silla || E. W. Elst || — || align=right | 9.6 km || 
|-id=553 bgcolor=#d6d6d6
| 10553 Stenkumla ||  ||  || March 17, 1993 || La Silla || UESAC || THM || align=right | 8.8 km || 
|-id=554 bgcolor=#d6d6d6
| 10554 Västerhejde ||  ||  || March 19, 1993 || La Silla || UESAC || — || align=right | 11 km || 
|-id=555 bgcolor=#d6d6d6
| 10555 Tagaharue || 1993 HH ||  || April 16, 1993 || Kitami || K. Endate, K. Watanabe || — || align=right | 16 km || 
|-id=556 bgcolor=#fefefe
| 10556 || 1993 QS || — || August 19, 1993 || Palomar || E. F. Helin || — || align=right | 4.0 km || 
|-id=557 bgcolor=#fefefe
| 10557 Rowland ||  ||  || September 15, 1993 || La Silla || E. W. Elst || — || align=right | 6.1 km || 
|-id=558 bgcolor=#fefefe
| 10558 Karlstad ||  ||  || September 15, 1993 || La Silla || E. W. Elst || V || align=right | 3.5 km || 
|-id=559 bgcolor=#fefefe
| 10559 Yukihisa ||  ||  || September 16, 1993 || Kitami || K. Endate, K. Watanabe || FLO || align=right | 3.1 km || 
|-id=560 bgcolor=#fefefe
| 10560 Michinari || 1993 TN ||  || October 8, 1993 || Kitami || K. Endate, K. Watanabe || — || align=right | 5.5 km || 
|-id=561 bgcolor=#E9E9E9
| 10561 Shimizumasahiro ||  ||  || October 15, 1993 || Kitami || K. Endate, K. Watanabe || — || align=right | 10 km || 
|-id=562 bgcolor=#fefefe
| 10562 ||  || — || October 19, 1993 || Palomar || E. F. Helin || — || align=right | 7.1 km || 
|-id=563 bgcolor=#FFC2E0
| 10563 Izhdubar || 1993 WD ||  || November 19, 1993 || Palomar || C. S. Shoemaker, E. M. Shoemaker || APO +1kmcritical || align=right | 1.5 km || 
|-id=564 bgcolor=#E9E9E9
| 10564 ||  || — || December 14, 1993 || Palomar || PCAS || EUN || align=right | 7.0 km || 
|-id=565 bgcolor=#E9E9E9
| 10565 ||  || — || January 9, 1994 || Fujieda || H. Shiozawa, T. Urata || — || align=right | 14 km || 
|-id=566 bgcolor=#E9E9E9
| 10566 Zabadak ||  ||  || January 14, 1994 || Yatsugatake || Y. Kushida, O. Muramatsu || — || align=right | 5.7 km || 
|-id=567 bgcolor=#E9E9E9
| 10567 Francobressan || 1994 CV ||  || February 7, 1994 || Farra d'Isonzo || Farra d'Isonzo || — || align=right | 4.0 km || 
|-id=568 bgcolor=#E9E9E9
| 10568 Yoshitanaka ||  ||  || February 2, 1994 || Kiyosato || S. Otomo || EUN || align=right | 6.2 km || 
|-id=569 bgcolor=#d6d6d6
| 10569 Kinoshitamasao || 1994 GQ ||  || April 8, 1994 || Kitami || K. Endate, K. Watanabe || — || align=right | 13 km || 
|-id=570 bgcolor=#d6d6d6
| 10570 Shibayasuo || 1994 GT ||  || April 8, 1994 || Kitami || K. Endate, K. Watanabe || — || align=right | 7.7 km || 
|-id=571 bgcolor=#d6d6d6
| 10571 ||  || — || June 5, 1994 || Catalina Station || C. W. Hergenrother || EUP || align=right | 8.3 km || 
|-id=572 bgcolor=#fefefe
| 10572 Kominejo ||  ||  || November 8, 1994 || Kiyosato || S. Otomo || — || align=right | 3.1 km || 
|-id=573 bgcolor=#fefefe
| 10573 Piani ||  ||  || November 29, 1994 || Stroncone || Santa Lucia Obs. || — || align=right | 4.7 km || 
|-id=574 bgcolor=#fefefe
| 10574 ||  || — || December 31, 1994 || Ōizumi || T. Kobayashi || — || align=right | 1.9 km || 
|-id=575 bgcolor=#fefefe
| 10575 ||  || — || December 31, 1994 || Ōizumi || T. Kobayashi || V || align=right | 3.3 km || 
|-id=576 bgcolor=#E9E9E9
| 10576 || 1995 GF || — || April 3, 1995 || Ōizumi || T. Kobayashi || — || align=right | 2.7 km || 
|-id=577 bgcolor=#E9E9E9
| 10577 Jihčesmuzeum || 1995 JC ||  || May 2, 1995 || Kleť || M. Tichý || — || align=right | 3.7 km || 
|-id=578 bgcolor=#FA8072
| 10578 || 1995 LH || — || June 5, 1995 || Siding Spring || G. J. Garradd || — || align=right | 5.6 km || 
|-id=579 bgcolor=#d6d6d6
| 10579 Diluca || 1995 OE ||  || July 20, 1995 || Bologna || San Vittore Obs. || EOS || align=right | 12 km || 
|-id=580 bgcolor=#E9E9E9
| 10580 || 1995 OV || — || July 24, 1995 || Nachi-Katsuura || Y. Shimizu, T. Urata || — || align=right | 4.4 km || 
|-id=581 bgcolor=#d6d6d6
| 10581 Jeníkhollan ||  ||  || July 30, 1995 || Ondřejov || P. Pravec || — || align=right | 9.3 km || 
|-id=582 bgcolor=#d6d6d6
| 10582 Harumi || 1995 TG ||  || October 3, 1995 || Moriyama || Y. Ikari || — || align=right | 15 km || 
|-id=583 bgcolor=#d6d6d6
| 10583 Kanetugu ||  ||  || November 21, 1995 || Nanyo || T. Okuni || MEL || align=right | 21 km || 
|-id=584 bgcolor=#fefefe
| 10584 Ferrini ||  ||  || April 14, 1996 || San Marcello || L. Tesi, A. Boattini || ERI || align=right | 3.3 km || 
|-id=585 bgcolor=#fefefe
| 10585 Wabi-Sabi ||  ||  || April 13, 1996 || Kitt Peak || Spacewatch || — || align=right | 1.9 km || 
|-id=586 bgcolor=#fefefe
| 10586 Jansteen ||  ||  || May 22, 1996 || La Silla || E. W. Elst || — || align=right | 4.3 km || 
|-id=587 bgcolor=#E9E9E9
| 10587 Strindberg ||  ||  || July 14, 1996 || La Silla || E. W. Elst || — || align=right | 5.7 km || 
|-id=588 bgcolor=#fefefe
| 10588 Adamcrandall || 1996 OE ||  || July 18, 1996 || Prescott || P. G. Comba || — || align=right | 1.8 km || 
|-id=589 bgcolor=#E9E9E9
| 10589 ||  || — || July 23, 1996 || Campo Imperatore || A. Boattini, A. Di Paola || — || align=right | 4.3 km || 
|-id=590 bgcolor=#fefefe
| 10590 ||  || — || July 24, 1996 || Campo Imperatore || A. Boattini, A. Di Paola || — || align=right | 4.0 km || 
|-id=591 bgcolor=#E9E9E9
| 10591 Caverni ||  ||  || August 13, 1996 || Montelupo || M. Tombelli, G. Forti || — || align=right | 5.5 km || 
|-id=592 bgcolor=#E9E9E9
| 10592 ||  || — || August 10, 1996 || Haleakalā || NEAT || — || align=right | 4.8 km || 
|-id=593 bgcolor=#d6d6d6
| 10593 Susannesandra ||  ||  || August 25, 1996 || King City, Ontario Observatory || R. G. Sandness || — || align=right | 14 km || 
|-id=594 bgcolor=#E9E9E9
| 10594 ||  || — || September 10, 1996 || Xinglong || SCAP || — || align=right | 6.5 km || 
|-id=595 bgcolor=#d6d6d6
| 10595 ||  || — || September 21, 1996 || Xinglong || SCAP || KOR || align=right | 6.7 km || 
|-id=596 bgcolor=#d6d6d6
| 10596 Stevensimpson || 1996 TS ||  || October 4, 1996 || Sudbury || D. di Cicco || KOR || align=right | 4.7 km || 
|-id=597 bgcolor=#fefefe
| 10597 ||  || — || October 9, 1996 || Kushiro || S. Ueda, H. Kaneda || — || align=right | 13 km || 
|-id=598 bgcolor=#E9E9E9
| 10598 Markrees ||  ||  || October 13, 1996 || Prescott || P. G. Comba || — || align=right | 3.7 km || 
|-id=599 bgcolor=#E9E9E9
| 10599 ||  || — || October 9, 1996 || Kushiro || S. Ueda, H. Kaneda || EUN || align=right | 4.3 km || 
|-id=600 bgcolor=#E9E9E9
| 10600 ||  || — || October 9, 1996 || Kushiro || S. Ueda, H. Kaneda || — || align=right | 4.0 km || 
|}

10601–10700 

|-bgcolor=#d6d6d6
| 10601 Hiwatashi || 1996 UC ||  || October 16, 1996 || Kuma Kogen || A. Nakamura || — || align=right | 12 km || 
|-id=602 bgcolor=#E9E9E9
| 10602 Masakazu ||  ||  || October 16, 1996 || Kiyosato || S. Otomo || EUN || align=right | 7.6 km || 
|-id=603 bgcolor=#E9E9E9
| 10603 ||  || — || October 29, 1996 || Xinglong || SCAP || — || align=right | 4.6 km || 
|-id=604 bgcolor=#d6d6d6
| 10604 Susanoo || 1996 VJ ||  || November 3, 1996 || Oohira || T. Urata || — || align=right | 12 km || 
|-id=605 bgcolor=#d6d6d6
| 10605 Guidoni ||  ||  || November 3, 1996 || Sormano || V. Giuliani, F. Manca || KOR || align=right | 7.1 km || 
|-id=606 bgcolor=#d6d6d6
| 10606 Crocco ||  ||  || November 3, 1996 || Sormano || V. Giuliani, F. Manca || URS || align=right | 10 km || 
|-id=607 bgcolor=#E9E9E9
| 10607 Amandahatton ||  ||  || November 13, 1996 || Prescott || P. G. Comba || EUN || align=right | 5.5 km || 
|-id=608 bgcolor=#d6d6d6
| 10608 Mameta ||  ||  || November 7, 1996 || Kitami || K. Endate, K. Watanabe || 3:2 || align=right | 25 km || 
|-id=609 bgcolor=#E9E9E9
| 10609 Hirai ||  ||  || November 28, 1996 || Kuma Kogen || A. Nakamura || — || align=right | 4.6 km || 
|-id=610 bgcolor=#d6d6d6
| 10610 ||  || — || December 2, 1996 || Ōizumi || T. Kobayashi || 3:2 || align=right | 23 km || 
|-id=611 bgcolor=#d6d6d6
| 10611 Yanjici ||  ||  || January 23, 1997 || Xinglong || SCAP || — || align=right | 17 km || 
|-id=612 bgcolor=#d6d6d6
| 10612 Houffalize ||  ||  || May 3, 1997 || La Silla || E. W. Elst || — || align=right | 6.0 km || 
|-id=613 bgcolor=#fefefe
| 10613 Kushinadahime ||  ||  || September 4, 1997 || Nachi-Katsuura || Y. Shimizu, T. Urata || — || align=right | 3.1 km || 
|-id=614 bgcolor=#fefefe
| 10614 ||  || — || October 21, 1997 || Nachi-Katsuura || Y. Shimizu, T. Urata || V || align=right | 4.4 km || 
|-id=615 bgcolor=#fefefe
| 10615 ||  || — || October 26, 1997 || Ōizumi || T. Kobayashi || — || align=right | 4.2 km || 
|-id=616 bgcolor=#E9E9E9
| 10616 Inouetakeshi ||  ||  || October 25, 1997 || Kitami || K. Endate, K. Watanabe || MIS || align=right | 8.9 km || 
|-id=617 bgcolor=#fefefe
| 10617 Takumi ||  ||  || October 25, 1997 || Nyukasa || M. Hirasawa, S. Suzuki || — || align=right | 4.5 km || 
|-id=618 bgcolor=#fefefe
| 10618 ||  || — || November 6, 1997 || Ōizumi || T. Kobayashi || — || align=right | 3.0 km || 
|-id=619 bgcolor=#fefefe
| 10619 Ninigi ||  ||  || November 27, 1997 || Gekko || T. Kagawa, T. Urata || V || align=right | 3.7 km || 
|-id=620 bgcolor=#fefefe
| 10620 ||  || — || November 29, 1997 || Socorro || LINEAR || — || align=right | 3.5 km || 
|-id=621 bgcolor=#E9E9E9
| 10621 || 1997 XN || — || December 3, 1997 || Ōizumi || T. Kobayashi || — || align=right | 5.1 km || 
|-id=622 bgcolor=#fefefe
| 10622 ||  || — || December 5, 1997 || Socorro || LINEAR || — || align=right | 2.9 km || 
|-id=623 bgcolor=#d6d6d6
| 10623 ||  || — || December 27, 1997 || Ōizumi || T. Kobayashi || HYG || align=right | 15 km || 
|-id=624 bgcolor=#d6d6d6
| 10624 ||  || — || December 31, 1997 || Ōizumi || T. Kobayashi || THM || align=right | 12 km || 
|-id=625 bgcolor=#d6d6d6
| 10625 ||  || — || January 2, 1998 || Socorro || LINEAR || THM || align=right | 13 km || 
|-id=626 bgcolor=#E9E9E9
| 10626 Zajíc ||  ||  || January 10, 1998 || Ondřejov || L. Kotková || — || align=right | 3.6 km || 
|-id=627 bgcolor=#d6d6d6
| 10627 Ookuninushi ||  ||  || January 19, 1998 || Nachi-Katsuura || Y. Shimizu, T. Urata || — || align=right | 9.2 km || 
|-id=628 bgcolor=#d6d6d6
| 10628 Feuerbacher ||  ||  || January 18, 1998 || Caussols || ODAS || HYG || align=right | 11 km || 
|-id=629 bgcolor=#E9E9E9
| 10629 ||  || — || January 23, 1998 || Socorro || LINEAR || — || align=right | 5.8 km || 
|-id=630 bgcolor=#d6d6d6
| 10630 ||  || — || January 23, 1998 || Socorro || LINEAR || KOR || align=right | 4.4 km || 
|-id=631 bgcolor=#d6d6d6
| 10631 ||  || — || January 24, 1998 || Haleakalā || NEAT || — || align=right | 17 km || 
|-id=632 bgcolor=#d6d6d6
| 10632 ||  || — || February 1, 1998 || Xinglong || SCAP || 3:2 || align=right | 20 km || 
|-id=633 bgcolor=#fefefe
| 10633 Akimasa ||  ||  || February 20, 1998 || Ondřejov || P. Pravec || V || align=right | 3.4 km || 
|-id=634 bgcolor=#fefefe
| 10634 Pepibican ||  ||  || April 8, 1998 || Ondřejov || L. Kotková || — || align=right | 4.6 km || 
|-id=635 bgcolor=#d6d6d6
| 10635 ||  || — || August 17, 1998 || Socorro || LINEAR || — || align=right | 9.0 km || 
|-id=636 bgcolor=#FFC2E0
| 10636 ||  || — || August 28, 1998 || Socorro || LINEAR || APO +1km || align=right data-sort-value="0.53" | 530 m || 
|-id=637 bgcolor=#d6d6d6
| 10637 Heimlich ||  ||  || August 26, 1998 || La Silla || E. W. Elst || — || align=right | 14 km || 
|-id=638 bgcolor=#d6d6d6
| 10638 McGlothlin ||  ||  || September 16, 1998 || Anderson Mesa || LONEOS || — || align=right | 15 km || 
|-id=639 bgcolor=#fefefe
| 10639 Gleason ||  ||  || November 14, 1998 || Kitt Peak || Spacewatch || — || align=right | 3.8 km || 
|-id=640 bgcolor=#fefefe
| 10640 ||  || — || November 25, 1998 || Socorro || LINEAR || — || align=right | 4.0 km || 
|-id=641 bgcolor=#d6d6d6
| 10641 ||  || — || December 14, 1998 || Socorro || LINEAR || THM || align=right | 9.2 km || 
|-id=642 bgcolor=#d6d6d6
| 10642 Charmaine ||  ||  || January 19, 1999 || San Marcello || A. Boattini, L. Tesi || — || align=right | 14 km || 
|-id=643 bgcolor=#E9E9E9
| 10643 ||  || — || February 12, 1999 || Socorro || LINEAR || — || align=right | 6.2 km || 
|-id=644 bgcolor=#d6d6d6
| 10644 ||  || — || February 19, 1999 || Ōizumi || T. Kobayashi || — || align=right | 9.5 km || 
|-id=645 bgcolor=#E9E9E9
| 10645 Brač ||  ||  || March 14, 1999 || Višnjan Observatory || K. Korlević || EUN || align=right | 10 km || 
|-id=646 bgcolor=#fefefe
| 10646 Machielalberts || 2077 P-L ||  || September 26, 1960 || Palomar || PLS || FLO || align=right | 4.5 km || 
|-id=647 bgcolor=#d6d6d6
| 10647 Meesters || 3074 P-L ||  || September 25, 1960 || Palomar || PLS (w/o T. Gehrels) || EOS || align=right | 7.9 km || 
|-id=648 bgcolor=#E9E9E9
| 10648 Plancius || 4089 P-L ||  || September 24, 1960 || Palomar || PLS || — || align=right | 8.5 km || 
|-id=649 bgcolor=#E9E9E9
| 10649 VOC || 4098 P-L ||  || September 24, 1960 || Palomar || PLS || GEF || align=right | 3.2 km || 
|-id=650 bgcolor=#fefefe
| 10650 Houtman || 4110 P-L ||  || September 24, 1960 || Palomar || PLS (w/o T. Gehrels) || — || align=right | 2.2 km || 
|-id=651 bgcolor=#E9E9E9
| 10651 van Linschoten || 4522 P-L ||  || September 24, 1960 || Palomar || PLS || PAD || align=right | 7.9 km || 
|-id=652 bgcolor=#E9E9E9
| 10652 Blaeu || 4599 P-L ||  || September 24, 1960 || Palomar || PLS || — || align=right | 7.2 km || 
|-id=653 bgcolor=#d6d6d6
| 10653 Witsen || 6030 P-L ||  || September 24, 1960 || Palomar || PLS || 7:4 || align=right | 18 km || 
|-id=654 bgcolor=#d6d6d6
| 10654 Bontekoe || 6673 P-L ||  || September 24, 1960 || Palomar || PLS || ALA || align=right | 14 km || 
|-id=655 bgcolor=#E9E9E9
| 10655 Pietkeyser || 9535 P-L ||  || October 17, 1960 || Palomar || PLS || WIT || align=right | 4.2 km || 
|-id=656 bgcolor=#d6d6d6
| 10656 Albrecht || 2213 T-1 ||  || March 25, 1971 || Palomar || PLS || — || align=right | 7.1 km || 
|-id=657 bgcolor=#E9E9E9
| 10657 Wanach || 2251 T-1 ||  || March 25, 1971 || Palomar || PLS || AGN || align=right | 3.6 km || 
|-id=658 bgcolor=#E9E9E9
| 10658 Gretadevries || 2281 T-1 ||  || March 25, 1971 || Palomar || PLS || HOF || align=right | 11 km || 
|-id=659 bgcolor=#d6d6d6
| 10659 Sauerland || 3266 T-1 ||  || March 26, 1971 || Palomar || PLS || THM || align=right | 7.5 km || 
|-id=660 bgcolor=#d6d6d6
| 10660 Felixhormuth || 4348 T-1 ||  || March 26, 1971 || Palomar || PLS || — || align=right | 7.2 km || 
|-id=661 bgcolor=#fefefe
| 10661 Teutoburgerwald || 1211 T-2 ||  || September 29, 1973 || Palomar || PLS || FLO || align=right | 5.0 km || 
|-id=662 bgcolor=#E9E9E9
| 10662 Peterwisse || 3201 T-2 ||  || September 30, 1973 || Palomar || PLS || — || align=right | 6.2 km || 
|-id=663 bgcolor=#d6d6d6
| 10663 Schwarzwald || 4283 T-2 ||  || September 29, 1973 || Palomar || PLS || THM || align=right | 8.9 km || 
|-id=664 bgcolor=#C2FFFF
| 10664 Phemios || 5187 T-2 ||  || September 25, 1973 || Palomar || PLS || L4 || align=right | 31 km || 
|-id=665 bgcolor=#E9E9E9
| 10665 Ortigão || 3019 T-3 ||  || October 16, 1977 || Palomar || PLS || GEF || align=right | 7.1 km || 
|-id=666 bgcolor=#fefefe
| 10666 Feldberg || 4171 T-3 ||  || October 16, 1977 || Palomar || PLS || — || align=right | 4.0 km || 
|-id=667 bgcolor=#fefefe
| 10667 van Marxveldt || 1975 UA ||  || October 28, 1975 || Palomar || T. Gehrels || H || align=right | 1.9 km || 
|-id=668 bgcolor=#E9E9E9
| 10668 Plansos ||  ||  || October 24, 1976 || La Silla || R. M. West || — || align=right | 11 km || 
|-id=669 bgcolor=#E9E9E9
| 10669 Herfordia || 1977 FN ||  || March 16, 1977 || La Silla || H.-E. Schuster || EUN || align=right | 6.6 km || 
|-id=670 bgcolor=#E9E9E9
| 10670 Seminozhenko ||  ||  || August 14, 1977 || Nauchnij || N. S. Chernykh || — || align=right | 12 km || 
|-id=671 bgcolor=#fefefe
| 10671 Mazurova ||  ||  || September 11, 1977 || Nauchnij || N. S. Chernykh || — || align=right | 4.6 km || 
|-id=672 bgcolor=#d6d6d6
| 10672 Kostyukova || 1978 QE ||  || August 31, 1978 || Nauchnij || N. S. Chernykh || — || align=right | 22 km || 
|-id=673 bgcolor=#fefefe
| 10673 Berezhnoy ||  ||  || November 7, 1978 || Palomar || E. F. Helin, S. J. Bus || — || align=right | 3.8 km || 
|-id=674 bgcolor=#fefefe
| 10674 de Elía ||  ||  || November 7, 1978 || Palomar || E. F. Helin, S. J. Bus || — || align=right | 7.1 km || 
|-id=675 bgcolor=#fefefe
| 10675 Kharlamov ||  ||  || November 1, 1978 || Nauchnij || L. V. Zhuravleva || NYS || align=right | 3.3 km || 
|-id=676 bgcolor=#fefefe
| 10676 Jamesmcdanell ||  ||  || June 25, 1979 || Siding Spring || E. F. Helin, S. J. Bus || — || align=right | 3.4 km || 
|-id=677 bgcolor=#fefefe
| 10677 Colucci ||  ||  || June 25, 1979 || Siding Spring || E. F. Helin, S. J. Bus || — || align=right | 3.6 km || 
|-id=678 bgcolor=#fefefe
| 10678 Alilagoa ||  ||  || June 25, 1979 || Siding Spring || E. F. Helin, S. J. Bus || V || align=right | 2.0 km || 
|-id=679 bgcolor=#d6d6d6
| 10679 Chankaochang ||  ||  || June 25, 1979 || Siding Spring || E. F. Helin, S. J. Bus || EOS || align=right | 7.0 km || 
|-id=680 bgcolor=#fefefe
| 10680 Ermakov ||  ||  || June 25, 1979 || Siding Spring || E. F. Helin, S. J. Bus || — || align=right | 2.9 km || 
|-id=681 bgcolor=#d6d6d6
| 10681 Khture ||  ||  || October 14, 1979 || Nauchnij || N. S. Chernykh || THM || align=right | 13 km || 
|-id=682 bgcolor=#fefefe
| 10682 || 1980 KK || — || May 22, 1980 || La Silla || H. Debehogne || — || align=right | 2.8 km || 
|-id=683 bgcolor=#fefefe
| 10683 Carter || 1980 LY ||  || June 10, 1980 || Palomar || C. S. Shoemaker, E. M. Shoemaker || — || align=right | 3.4 km || 
|-id=684 bgcolor=#fefefe
| 10684 Babkina ||  ||  || September 8, 1980 || Nauchnij || L. V. Zhuravleva || slow || align=right | 3.1 km || 
|-id=685 bgcolor=#E9E9E9
| 10685 Kharkivuniver || 1980 VO ||  || November 9, 1980 || Anderson Mesa || E. Bowell || — || align=right | 5.5 km || 
|-id=686 bgcolor=#E9E9E9
| 10686 Kaluna ||  ||  || November 1, 1980 || Palomar || S. J. Bus || — || align=right | 7.5 km || 
|-id=687 bgcolor=#fefefe
| 10687 || 1980 XX || — || December 7, 1980 || Nanking || Purple Mountain Obs. || FLO || align=right | 1.8 km || 
|-id=688 bgcolor=#d6d6d6
| 10688 Haghighipour || 1981 DK ||  || February 28, 1981 || Siding Spring || S. J. Bus || — || align=right | 17 km || 
|-id=689 bgcolor=#d6d6d6
| 10689 Pinillaalonso ||  ||  || February 28, 1981 || Siding Spring || S. J. Bus || ALA || align=right | 13 km || 
|-id=690 bgcolor=#d6d6d6
| 10690 Massera ||  ||  || February 28, 1981 || Siding Spring || S. J. Bus || — || align=right | 9.2 km || 
|-id=691 bgcolor=#d6d6d6
| 10691 Sans ||  ||  || March 2, 1981 || Siding Spring || S. J. Bus || — || align=right | 9.3 km || 
|-id=692 bgcolor=#fefefe
| 10692 Opeil ||  ||  || March 2, 1981 || Siding Spring || S. J. Bus || FLO || align=right | 3.1 km || 
|-id=693 bgcolor=#E9E9E9
| 10693 Zangari ||  ||  || March 2, 1981 || Siding Spring || S. J. Bus || — || align=right | 4.8 km || 
|-id=694 bgcolor=#d6d6d6
| 10694 Lacerda ||  ||  || March 2, 1981 || Siding Spring || S. J. Bus || ALA || align=right | 12 km || 
|-id=695 bgcolor=#d6d6d6
| 10695 Yasunorifujiwara ||  ||  || March 2, 1981 || Siding Spring || S. J. Bus || HYG || align=right | 9.6 km || 
|-id=696 bgcolor=#fefefe
| 10696 Giuliattiwinter ||  ||  || March 2, 1981 || Siding Spring || S. J. Bus || — || align=right | 3.9 km || 
|-id=697 bgcolor=#E9E9E9
| 10697 Othonwinter ||  ||  || March 2, 1981 || Siding Spring || S. J. Bus || — || align=right | 5.4 km || 
|-id=698 bgcolor=#fefefe
| 10698 Singer ||  ||  || March 3, 1981 || Siding Spring || S. J. Bus || — || align=right | 2.2 km || 
|-id=699 bgcolor=#d6d6d6
| 10699 Calabrese ||  ||  || March 6, 1981 || Siding Spring || S. J. Bus || — || align=right | 10 km || 
|-id=700 bgcolor=#E9E9E9
| 10700 Juanangelviera ||  ||  || March 2, 1981 || Siding Spring || S. J. Bus || — || align=right | 3.3 km || 
|}

10701–10800 

|-bgcolor=#fefefe
| 10701 Marilynsimons || 1981 PF ||  || August 8, 1981 || Harvard Observatory || Harvard Obs. || — || align=right | 5.6 km || 
|-id=702 bgcolor=#fefefe
| 10702 Arizorcas || 1981 QD ||  || August 30, 1981 || Flagstaff || E. Bowell || — || align=right | 3.3 km || 
|-id=703 bgcolor=#fefefe
| 10703 ||  || — || August 23, 1981 || La Silla || H. Debehogne || — || align=right | 3.7 km || 
|-id=704 bgcolor=#d6d6d6
| 10704 ||  || — || September 1, 1981 || La Silla || H. Debehogne || KOR || align=right | 7.4 km || 
|-id=705 bgcolor=#fefefe
| 10705 || 1981 SL || — || September 22, 1981 || Kleť || A. Mrkos || — || align=right | 2.9 km || 
|-id=706 bgcolor=#fefefe
| 10706 ||  || — || September 26, 1981 || Anderson Mesa || N. G. Thomas || NYS || align=right | 2.9 km || 
|-id=707 bgcolor=#fefefe
| 10707 Prunariu ||  ||  || October 24, 1981 || Palomar || S. J. Bus || — || align=right | 6.0 km || 
|-id=708 bgcolor=#d6d6d6
| 10708 Richardspalding ||  ||  || October 25, 1981 || Palomar || S. J. Bus || KOR || align=right | 7.9 km || 
|-id=709 bgcolor=#E9E9E9
| 10709 Ottofranz ||  ||  || January 24, 1982 || Anderson Mesa || E. Bowell || — || align=right | 4.5 km || 
|-id=710 bgcolor=#fefefe
| 10710 ||  || — || May 15, 1982 || Palomar || Palomar Obs. || FLO || align=right | 3.6 km || 
|-id=711 bgcolor=#E9E9E9
| 10711 Pskov ||  ||  || October 15, 1982 || Nauchnij || L. V. Zhuravleva || — || align=right | 13 km || 
|-id=712 bgcolor=#fefefe
| 10712 Malashchuk ||  ||  || October 20, 1982 || Nauchnij || L. G. Karachkina || NYS || align=right | 3.4 km || 
|-id=713 bgcolor=#E9E9E9
| 10713 Limorenko ||  ||  || October 22, 1982 || Nauchnij || L. G. Karachkina || — || align=right | 9.7 km || 
|-id=714 bgcolor=#E9E9E9
| 10714 || 1983 QG || — || August 31, 1983 || IRAS || IRAS || — || align=right | 11 km || 
|-id=715 bgcolor=#E9E9E9
| 10715 Nagler ||  ||  || September 11, 1983 || Anderson Mesa || B. A. Skiff || — || align=right | 5.2 km || 
|-id=716 bgcolor=#E9E9E9
| 10716 Olivermorton || 1983 WQ ||  || November 29, 1983 || Anderson Mesa || E. Bowell || — || align=right | 15 km || 
|-id=717 bgcolor=#fefefe
| 10717 Dickwalker || 1983 XC ||  || December 1, 1983 || Anderson Mesa || E. Bowell || FLO || align=right | 3.3 km || 
|-id=718 bgcolor=#d6d6d6
| 10718 Samusʹ ||  ||  || August 23, 1985 || Nauchnij || N. S. Chernykh || — || align=right | 4.9 km || 
|-id=719 bgcolor=#fefefe
| 10719 Andamar || 1985 TW ||  || October 15, 1985 || Anderson Mesa || E. Bowell || MAS || align=right | 4.4 km || 
|-id=720 bgcolor=#fefefe
| 10720 Danzl || 1986 GY ||  || April 5, 1986 || Kitt Peak || Spacewatch || — || align=right | 4.4 km || 
|-id=721 bgcolor=#fefefe
| 10721 Tuterov ||  ||  || August 17, 1986 || Nauchnij || L. G. Karachkina || FLO || align=right | 4.8 km || 
|-id=722 bgcolor=#fefefe
| 10722 Monari || 1986 TB ||  || October 1, 1986 || Bologna || San Vittore Obs. || — || align=right | 4.0 km || 
|-id=723 bgcolor=#fefefe
| 10723 || 1986 TH || — || October 3, 1986 || Brorfelde || P. Jensen || — || align=right | 2.7 km || 
|-id=724 bgcolor=#fefefe
| 10724 Carolraymond ||  ||  || November 5, 1986 || Anderson Mesa || E. Bowell || V || align=right | 4.1 km || 
|-id=725 bgcolor=#fefefe
| 10725 Sukunabikona || 1986 WB ||  || November 22, 1986 || Toyota || K. Suzuki, T. Urata || V || align=right | 3.1 km || 
|-id=726 bgcolor=#fefefe
| 10726 Elodie ||  ||  || January 28, 1987 || La Silla || E. W. Elst || NYS || align=right | 3.3 km || 
|-id=727 bgcolor=#d6d6d6
| 10727 Akitsushima || 1987 DN ||  || February 25, 1987 || Ojima || T. Niijima, T. Urata || — || align=right | 10 km || 
|-id=728 bgcolor=#fefefe
| 10728 Vladimirfock ||  ||  || September 4, 1987 || Nauchnij || L. V. Zhuravleva || — || align=right | 3.2 km || 
|-id=729 bgcolor=#E9E9E9
| 10729 Tsvetkova ||  ||  || September 4, 1987 || Nauchnij || L. V. Zhuravleva || — || align=right | 4.3 km || 
|-id=730 bgcolor=#fefefe
| 10730 White || 1987 SU ||  || September 19, 1987 || Anderson Mesa || E. Bowell || — || align=right | 4.3 km || 
|-id=731 bgcolor=#fefefe
| 10731 ||  || — || January 16, 1988 || La Silla || H. Debehogne || — || align=right | 5.0 km || 
|-id=732 bgcolor=#fefefe
| 10732 ||  || — || January 17, 1988 || La Silla || H. Debehogne || — || align=right | 4.2 km || 
|-id=733 bgcolor=#d6d6d6
| 10733 Georgesand ||  ||  || February 11, 1988 || La Silla || E. W. Elst || KOR || align=right | 6.3 km || 
|-id=734 bgcolor=#d6d6d6
| 10734 Wieck ||  ||  || February 13, 1988 || La Silla || E. W. Elst || EOS || align=right | 9.4 km || 
|-id=735 bgcolor=#fefefe
| 10735 Seine ||  ||  || February 15, 1988 || La Silla || E. W. Elst || — || align=right | 3.1 km || 
|-id=736 bgcolor=#d6d6d6
| 10736 Marybrück ||  ||  || February 22, 1988 || Siding Spring || R. H. McNaught || EOS || align=right | 4.9 km || 
|-id=737 bgcolor=#FA8072
| 10737 Brück ||  ||  || February 25, 1988 || Siding Spring || R. H. McNaught || H || align=right | 2.6 km || 
|-id=738 bgcolor=#fefefe
| 10738 Marcoaldo ||  ||  || March 17, 1988 || La Silla || W. Ferreri || V || align=right | 3.3 km || 
|-id=739 bgcolor=#d6d6d6
| 10739 Lowman ||  ||  || May 12, 1988 || Palomar || C. S. Shoemaker, E. M. Shoemaker || Tj (2.99) || align=right | 7.1 km || 
|-id=740 bgcolor=#E9E9E9
| 10740 Fallersleben ||  ||  || September 8, 1988 || Tautenburg Observatory || F. Börngen || — || align=right | 6.2 km || 
|-id=741 bgcolor=#E9E9E9
| 10741 Valeriocarruba ||  ||  || September 16, 1988 || Cerro Tololo || S. J. Bus || — || align=right | 5.7 km || 
|-id=742 bgcolor=#E9E9E9
| 10742 ||  || — || November 7, 1988 || Okutama || T. Hioki, N. Kawasato || — || align=right | 4.6 km || 
|-id=743 bgcolor=#E9E9E9
| 10743 ||  || — || November 12, 1988 || Palomar || E. F. Helin || EUN || align=right | 7.4 km || 
|-id=744 bgcolor=#E9E9E9
| 10744 Tsuruta || 1988 XO ||  || December 5, 1988 || Chiyoda || T. Kojima || MAR || align=right | 6.2 km || 
|-id=745 bgcolor=#d6d6d6
| 10745 Arnstadt ||  ||  || January 11, 1989 || Tautenburg Observatory || F. Börngen || — || align=right | 10 km || 
|-id=746 bgcolor=#E9E9E9
| 10746 Mühlhausen ||  ||  || February 10, 1989 || Tautenburg Observatory || F. Börngen || EUN || align=right | 5.3 km || 
|-id=747 bgcolor=#fefefe
| 10747 Köthen ||  ||  || February 1, 1989 || Tautenburg Observatory || F. Börngen || FLO || align=right | 2.7 km || 
|-id=748 bgcolor=#E9E9E9
| 10748 ||  || — || February 8, 1989 || La Silla || H. Debehogne || — || align=right | 14 km || 
|-id=749 bgcolor=#fefefe
| 10749 Musäus ||  ||  || April 6, 1989 || Tautenburg Observatory || F. Börngen || NYS || align=right | 2.3 km || 
|-id=750 bgcolor=#fefefe
| 10750 || 1989 PT || — || August 9, 1989 || Palomar || E. F. Helin || fast? || align=right | 2.9 km || 
|-id=751 bgcolor=#d6d6d6
| 10751 ||  || — || October 29, 1989 || Gekko || Y. Oshima || — || align=right | 11 km || 
|-id=752 bgcolor=#fefefe
| 10752 ||  || — || November 25, 1989 || Kushiro || S. Ueda, H. Kaneda || V || align=right | 3.4 km || 
|-id=753 bgcolor=#E9E9E9
| 10753 van de Velde ||  ||  || November 28, 1989 || Tautenburg Observatory || F. Börngen || — || align=right | 8.8 km || 
|-id=754 bgcolor=#fefefe
| 10754 ||  || — || August 29, 1990 || Palomar || H. E. Holt || — || align=right | 3.4 km || 
|-id=755 bgcolor=#d6d6d6
| 10755 ||  || — || September 10, 1990 || La Silla || H. Debehogne || KOR || align=right | 5.9 km || 
|-id=756 bgcolor=#fefefe
| 10756 ||  || — || September 17, 1990 || Palomar || H. E. Holt || — || align=right | 3.9 km || 
|-id=757 bgcolor=#fefefe
| 10757 ||  || — || September 18, 1990 || Palomar || H. E. Holt || — || align=right | 4.5 km || 
|-id=758 bgcolor=#fefefe
| 10758 Aldoushuxley ||  ||  || September 22, 1990 || La Silla || E. W. Elst || FLO || align=right | 2.8 km || 
|-id=759 bgcolor=#d6d6d6
| 10759 ||  || — || September 17, 1990 || Palomar || H. E. Holt || — || align=right | 8.6 km || 
|-id=760 bgcolor=#fefefe
| 10760 Ozeki ||  ||  || October 15, 1990 || Kitami || K. Endate, K. Watanabe || FLO || align=right | 4.1 km || 
|-id=761 bgcolor=#E9E9E9
| 10761 Lyubimets ||  ||  || October 12, 1990 || Tautenburg Observatory || L. D. Schmadel, F. Börngen || — || align=right | 4.3 km || 
|-id=762 bgcolor=#d6d6d6
| 10762 von Laue ||  ||  || October 12, 1990 || Tautenburg Observatory || F. Börngen, L. D. Schmadel || — || align=right | 6.7 km || 
|-id=763 bgcolor=#d6d6d6
| 10763 Hlawka ||  ||  || October 12, 1990 || Tautenburg Observatory || L. D. Schmadel, F. Börngen || EOS || align=right | 9.2 km || 
|-id=764 bgcolor=#d6d6d6
| 10764 Rübezahl ||  ||  || October 12, 1990 || Tautenburg Observatory || F. Börngen, L. D. Schmadel || EOS || align=right | 7.5 km || 
|-id=765 bgcolor=#d6d6d6
| 10765 || 1990 UZ || — || October 20, 1990 || Dynic || A. Sugie || EOS || align=right | 14 km || 
|-id=766 bgcolor=#d6d6d6
| 10766 ||  || — || October 20, 1990 || Dynic || A. Sugie || — || align=right | 21 km || 
|-id=767 bgcolor=#fefefe
| 10767 Toyomasu ||  ||  || October 22, 1990 || Kitami || K. Endate, K. Watanabe || — || align=right | 3.3 km || 
|-id=768 bgcolor=#fefefe
| 10768 Sarutahiko ||  ||  || October 21, 1990 || Oohira || T. Urata || FLO || align=right | 2.1 km || 
|-id=769 bgcolor=#d6d6d6
| 10769 Minas Gerais ||  ||  || October 16, 1990 || La Silla || E. W. Elst || EOS || align=right | 10 km || 
|-id=770 bgcolor=#d6d6d6
| 10770 Belo Horizonte ||  ||  || November 15, 1990 || La Silla || E. W. Elst || EOS || align=right | 7.7 km || 
|-id=771 bgcolor=#d6d6d6
| 10771 Ouro Prêto ||  ||  || November 15, 1990 || La Silla || E. W. Elst || — || align=right | 8.4 km || 
|-id=772 bgcolor=#fefefe
| 10772 || 1990 YM || — || December 23, 1990 || Kushiro || S. Ueda, H. Kaneda || PHO || align=right | 6.4 km || 
|-id=773 bgcolor=#d6d6d6
| 10773 Jamespaton ||  ||  || January 7, 1991 || Siding Spring || R. H. McNaught || ALA || align=right | 10 km || 
|-id=774 bgcolor=#fefefe
| 10774 Eisenach ||  ||  || January 15, 1991 || Tautenburg Observatory || F. Börngen || — || align=right | 3.0 km || 
|-id=775 bgcolor=#fefefe
| 10775 Leipzig ||  ||  || January 15, 1991 || Tautenburg Observatory || F. Börngen || NYS || align=right | 3.2 km || 
|-id=776 bgcolor=#fefefe
| 10776 Musashitomiyo ||  ||  || February 12, 1991 || Yorii || M. Arai, H. Mori || — || align=right | 3.4 km || 
|-id=777 bgcolor=#fefefe
| 10777 ||  || — || March 13, 1991 || La Silla || H. Debehogne || V || align=right | 3.3 km || 
|-id=778 bgcolor=#fefefe
| 10778 Marcks ||  ||  || April 9, 1991 || Tautenburg Observatory || F. Börngen || FLO || align=right | 3.1 km || 
|-id=779 bgcolor=#E9E9E9
| 10779 || 1991 LW || — || June 14, 1991 || Palomar || E. F. Helin || — || align=right | 12 km || 
|-id=780 bgcolor=#E9E9E9
| 10780 Apollinaire ||  ||  || August 2, 1991 || La Silla || E. W. Elst || — || align=right | 5.0 km || 
|-id=781 bgcolor=#E9E9E9
| 10781 Ritter ||  ||  || August 6, 1991 || Tautenburg Observatory || F. Börngen || — || align=right | 8.6 km || 
|-id=782 bgcolor=#fefefe
| 10782 Hittmair ||  ||  || September 12, 1991 || Tautenburg Observatory || L. D. Schmadel, F. Börngen || — || align=right | 2.8 km || 
|-id=783 bgcolor=#d6d6d6
| 10783 ||  || — || September 11, 1991 || Palomar || H. E. Holt || KAR || align=right | 5.8 km || 
|-id=784 bgcolor=#E9E9E9
| 10784 Noailles ||  ||  || September 4, 1991 || La Silla || E. W. Elst || MAR || align=right | 6.1 km || 
|-id=785 bgcolor=#d6d6d6
| 10785 Dejaiffe ||  ||  || September 4, 1991 || La Silla || E. W. Elst || — || align=right | 4.4 km || 
|-id=786 bgcolor=#fefefe
| 10786 Robertmayer ||  ||  || October 7, 1991 || Tautenburg Observatory || F. Börngen, L. D. Schmadel || — || align=right | 2.3 km || 
|-id=787 bgcolor=#d6d6d6
| 10787 Ottoburkard ||  ||  || October 4, 1991 || Tautenburg Observatory || L. D. Schmadel, F. Börngen || — || align=right | 6.9 km || 
|-id=788 bgcolor=#d6d6d6
| 10788 || 1991 UC || — || October 18, 1991 || Kushiro || S. Ueda, H. Kaneda || — || align=right | 5.7 km || 
|-id=789 bgcolor=#d6d6d6
| 10789 Mikeread ||  ||  || November 5, 1991 || Kitt Peak || Spacewatch || KOR || align=right | 3.5 km || 
|-id=790 bgcolor=#d6d6d6
| 10790 || 1991 XS || — || December 5, 1991 || Kushiro || S. Ueda, H. Kaneda || — || align=right | 15 km || 
|-id=791 bgcolor=#d6d6d6
| 10791 Uson || 1992 CS ||  || February 8, 1992 || Geisei || T. Seki || ALA || align=right | 17 km || 
|-id=792 bgcolor=#d6d6d6
| 10792 Ecuador ||  ||  || February 2, 1992 || La Silla || E. W. Elst || EOS || align=right | 10 km || 
|-id=793 bgcolor=#d6d6d6
| 10793 Quito ||  ||  || February 2, 1992 || La Silla || E. W. Elst || VER || align=right | 16 km || 
|-id=794 bgcolor=#d6d6d6
| 10794 Vänge ||  ||  || February 29, 1992 || La Silla || UESAC || — || align=right | 11 km || 
|-id=795 bgcolor=#d6d6d6
| 10795 Babben ||  ||  || March 1, 1992 || La Silla || UESAC || ALA || align=right | 17 km || 
|-id=796 bgcolor=#fefefe
| 10796 Sollerman ||  ||  || March 2, 1992 || La Silla || UESAC || — || align=right | 3.0 km || 
|-id=797 bgcolor=#fefefe
| 10797 Guatemala ||  ||  || April 4, 1992 || La Silla || E. W. Elst || — || align=right | 3.2 km || 
|-id=798 bgcolor=#fefefe
| 10798 || 1992 LK || — || June 3, 1992 || Palomar || G. J. Leonard || — || align=right | 3.9 km || 
|-id=799 bgcolor=#fefefe
| 10799 Yucatán ||  ||  || July 26, 1992 || La Silla || E. W. Elst || — || align=right | 8.7 km || 
|-id=800 bgcolor=#E9E9E9
| 10800 ||  || — || July 22, 1992 || La Silla || H. Debehogne, Á. López-G. || — || align=right | 3.3 km || 
|}

10801–10900 

|-bgcolor=#E9E9E9
| 10801 Lüneburg ||  ||  || September 23, 1992 || Tautenburg Observatory || F. Börngen || — || align=right | 3.5 km || 
|-id=802 bgcolor=#E9E9E9
| 10802 Masamifuruya ||  ||  || October 28, 1992 || Kitami || K. Endate, K. Watanabe || — || align=right | 4.8 km || 
|-id=803 bgcolor=#E9E9E9
| 10803 Caléyo ||  ||  || October 21, 1992 || Geisei || T. Seki || — || align=right | 7.2 km || 
|-id=804 bgcolor=#E9E9E9
| 10804 Amenouzume ||  ||  || November 23, 1992 || Oohira || T. Urata || — || align=right | 9.4 km || 
|-id=805 bgcolor=#E9E9E9
| 10805 Iwano ||  ||  || November 18, 1992 || Kitami || K. Endate, K. Watanabe || — || align=right | 12 km || 
|-id=806 bgcolor=#d6d6d6
| 10806 Mexico ||  ||  || March 23, 1993 || Caussols || E. W. Elst || HYG || align=right | 11 km || 
|-id=807 bgcolor=#d6d6d6
| 10807 Uggarde ||  ||  || March 17, 1993 || La Silla || UESAC || THM || align=right | 13 km || 
|-id=808 bgcolor=#d6d6d6
| 10808 Digerrojr ||  ||  || March 17, 1993 || La Silla || UESAC || EOS || align=right | 8.6 km || 
|-id=809 bgcolor=#d6d6d6
| 10809 Majsterrojr ||  ||  || March 17, 1993 || La Silla || UESAC || HYG || align=right | 13 km || 
|-id=810 bgcolor=#d6d6d6
| 10810 Lejsturojr ||  ||  || March 17, 1993 || La Silla || UESAC || — || align=right | 12 km || 
|-id=811 bgcolor=#d6d6d6
| 10811 Lau ||  ||  || March 17, 1993 || La Silla || UESAC || LAU || align=right | 7.7 km || 
|-id=812 bgcolor=#d6d6d6
| 10812 Grötlingbo ||  ||  || March 21, 1993 || La Silla || UESAC || — || align=right | 11 km || 
|-id=813 bgcolor=#d6d6d6
| 10813 Mästerby ||  ||  || March 19, 1993 || La Silla || UESAC || ALA || align=right | 14 km || 
|-id=814 bgcolor=#d6d6d6
| 10814 Gnisvärd ||  ||  || March 19, 1993 || La Silla || UESAC || — || align=right | 9.8 km || 
|-id=815 bgcolor=#d6d6d6
| 10815 Östergarn ||  ||  || March 19, 1993 || La Silla || UESAC || — || align=right | 7.3 km || 
|-id=816 bgcolor=#d6d6d6
| 10816 ||  || — || March 19, 1993 || La Silla || UESAC || THM || align=right | 11 km || 
|-id=817 bgcolor=#d6d6d6
| 10817 ||  || — || March 21, 1993 || La Silla || UESAC || HYG || align=right | 16 km || 
|-id=818 bgcolor=#d6d6d6
| 10818 ||  || — || March 18, 1993 || La Silla || UESAC || EOS || align=right | 8.1 km || 
|-id=819 bgcolor=#d6d6d6
| 10819 Mahakala || 1993 HG ||  || April 19, 1993 || USNO Flagstaff || J. DeYoung || THM || align=right | 8.7 km || 
|-id=820 bgcolor=#fefefe
| 10820 Offenbach ||  ||  || August 18, 1993 || Caussols || E. W. Elst || — || align=right | 3.9 km || 
|-id=821 bgcolor=#fefefe
| 10821 Kimuratakeshi || 1993 SZ ||  || September 16, 1993 || Kitami || K. Endate, K. Watanabe || FLO || align=right | 3.8 km || 
|-id=822 bgcolor=#fefefe
| 10822 Yasunori ||  ||  || September 16, 1993 || Kitami || K. Endate, K. Watanabe || — || align=right | 2.9 km || 
|-id=823 bgcolor=#fefefe
| 10823 Sakaguchi ||  ||  || September 16, 1993 || Kitami || K. Endate, K. Watanabe || — || align=right | 3.2 km || 
|-id=824 bgcolor=#fefefe
| 10824 ||  || — || September 24, 1993 || Siding Spring || G. J. Garradd || FLO || align=right | 4.6 km || 
|-id=825 bgcolor=#fefefe
| 10825 Augusthermann ||  ||  || September 18, 1993 || Tautenburg Observatory || F. Börngen || V || align=right | 3.2 km || 
|-id=826 bgcolor=#fefefe
| 10826 ||  || — || September 19, 1993 || Palomar || H. E. Holt || — || align=right | 7.2 km || 
|-id=827 bgcolor=#fefefe
| 10827 Doikazunori ||  ||  || October 11, 1993 || Kitami || K. Endate, K. Watanabe || — || align=right | 3.2 km || 
|-id=828 bgcolor=#fefefe
| 10828 Tomjones ||  ||  || October 8, 1993 || Kitt Peak || Spacewatch || — || align=right | 4.1 km || 
|-id=829 bgcolor=#fefefe
| 10829 Matsuobasho || 1993 UU ||  || October 22, 1993 || Geisei || T. Seki || — || align=right | 4.3 km || 
|-id=830 bgcolor=#E9E9E9
| 10830 Desforges ||  ||  || October 20, 1993 || La Silla || E. W. Elst || — || align=right | 9.4 km || 
|-id=831 bgcolor=#E9E9E9
| 10831 Takamagahara ||  ||  || November 15, 1993 || Oohira || T. Urata || — || align=right | 4.2 km || 
|-id=832 bgcolor=#fefefe
| 10832 Hazamashigetomi ||  ||  || November 15, 1993 || Ōizumi || T. Kobayashi || — || align=right | 2.3 km || 
|-id=833 bgcolor=#fefefe
| 10833 ||  || — || November 11, 1993 || Kushiro || S. Ueda, H. Kaneda || — || align=right | 2.8 km || 
|-id=834 bgcolor=#fefefe
| 10834 Zembsch-Schreve ||  ||  || November 8, 1993 || Kitt Peak || Spacewatch || — || align=right | 4.1 km || 
|-id=835 bgcolor=#fefefe
| 10835 Fröbel ||  ||  || November 12, 1993 || Tautenburg Observatory || F. Börngen || V || align=right | 3.0 km || 
|-id=836 bgcolor=#E9E9E9
| 10836 ||  || — || February 14, 1994 || Ōizumi || T. Kobayashi || — || align=right | 7.0 km || 
|-id=837 bgcolor=#E9E9E9
| 10837 Yuyakekoyake ||  ||  || March 6, 1994 || Nyukasa || M. Hirasawa, S. Suzuki || HNS || align=right | 8.9 km || 
|-id=838 bgcolor=#E9E9E9
| 10838 Lebon ||  ||  || March 9, 1994 || Caussols || E. W. Elst || EUN || align=right | 6.4 km || 
|-id=839 bgcolor=#E9E9E9
| 10839 Hufeland ||  ||  || April 3, 1994 || Tautenburg Observatory || F. Börngen || — || align=right | 8.8 km || 
|-id=840 bgcolor=#d6d6d6
| 10840 || 1994 LR || — || June 1, 1994 || Kiyosato || A. Sugie || — || align=right | 24 km || 
|-id=841 bgcolor=#fefefe
| 10841 Ericforbes ||  ||  || August 12, 1994 || Siding Spring || R. H. McNaught || H || align=right | 2.9 km || 
|-id=842 bgcolor=#fefefe
| 10842 ||  || — || October 31, 1994 || Kushiro || S. Ueda, H. Kaneda || — || align=right | 3.6 km || 
|-id=843 bgcolor=#fefefe
| 10843 ||  || — || December 30, 1994 || Kushiro || S. Ueda, H. Kaneda || — || align=right | 4.5 km || 
|-id=844 bgcolor=#fefefe
| 10844 || 1995 AG || — || January 2, 1995 || Ōizumi || T. Kobayashi || — || align=right | 3.0 km || 
|-id=845 bgcolor=#fefefe
| 10845 ||  || — || January 6, 1995 || Ōizumi || T. Kobayashi || — || align=right | 2.6 km || 
|-id=846 bgcolor=#fefefe
| 10846 ||  || — || January 2, 1995 || Kushiro || S. Ueda, H. Kaneda || FLO || align=right | 4.4 km || 
|-id=847 bgcolor=#d6d6d6
| 10847 Koch ||  ||  || January 5, 1995 || Tautenburg Observatory || F. Börngen || EOS || align=right | 7.1 km || 
|-id=848 bgcolor=#fefefe
| 10848 ||  || — || January 25, 1995 || Ōizumi || T. Kobayashi || FLO || align=right | 4.1 km || 
|-id=849 bgcolor=#fefefe
| 10849 ||  || — || January 25, 1995 || Kiyosato || S. Otomo || FLO || align=right | 4.3 km || 
|-id=850 bgcolor=#fefefe
| 10850 Denso ||  ||  || January 26, 1995 || Kuma Kogen || A. Nakamura || — || align=right | 1.5 km || 
|-id=851 bgcolor=#fefefe
| 10851 || 1995 CE || — || February 1, 1995 || Ōizumi || T. Kobayashi || FLO || align=right | 4.8 km || 
|-id=852 bgcolor=#fefefe
| 10852 || 1995 CK || — || February 1, 1995 || Ōizumi || T. Kobayashi || V || align=right | 2.6 km || 
|-id=853 bgcolor=#fefefe
| 10853 Aimoto || 1995 CW ||  || February 6, 1995 || Chiyoda || T. Kojima || V || align=right | 2.1 km || 
|-id=854 bgcolor=#fefefe
| 10854 ||  || — || February 22, 1995 || Ōizumi || T. Kobayashi || — || align=right | 3.0 km || 
|-id=855 bgcolor=#fefefe
| 10855 ||  || — || February 26, 1995 || Ōizumi || T. Kobayashi || — || align=right | 4.7 km || 
|-id=856 bgcolor=#d6d6d6
| 10856 Bechstein ||  ||  || March 4, 1995 || Tautenburg Observatory || F. Börngen || — || align=right | 17 km || 
|-id=857 bgcolor=#fefefe
| 10857 Blüthner ||  ||  || March 5, 1995 || Tautenburg Observatory || F. Börngen || NYS || align=right | 3.7 km || 
|-id=858 bgcolor=#fefefe
| 10858 || 1995 FT || — || March 28, 1995 || Ōizumi || T. Kobayashi || NYS || align=right | 4.0 km || 
|-id=859 bgcolor=#E9E9E9
| 10859 ||  || — || April 1, 1995 || Kiyosato || S. Otomo || — || align=right | 7.8 km || 
|-id=860 bgcolor=#FFC2E0
| 10860 || 1995 LE || — || June 3, 1995 || Kitt Peak || Spacewatch || AMO +1km || align=right | 1.3 km || 
|-id=861 bgcolor=#E9E9E9
| 10861 Ciske ||  ||  || June 22, 1995 || Kitt Peak || Spacewatch || CLO || align=right | 8.6 km || 
|-id=862 bgcolor=#d6d6d6
| 10862 ||  || — || August 26, 1995 || Catalina Station || T. B. Spahr || — || align=right | 11 km || 
|-id=863 bgcolor=#d6d6d6
| 10863 Oye ||  ||  || August 31, 1995 || Haleakalā || AMOS || — || align=right | 4.6 km || 
|-id=864 bgcolor=#d6d6d6
| 10864 Yamagatashi ||  ||  || August 31, 1995 || Nanyo || T. Okuni || — || align=right | 21 km || 
|-id=865 bgcolor=#d6d6d6
| 10865 Thelmaruby ||  ||  || September 21, 1995 || Kitt Peak || Spacewatch || THM || align=right | 12 km || 
|-id=866 bgcolor=#fefefe
| 10866 Peru ||  ||  || July 14, 1996 || La Silla || E. W. Elst || NYS || align=right | 6.4 km || 
|-id=867 bgcolor=#E9E9E9
| 10867 Lima ||  ||  || July 14, 1996 || La Silla || E. W. Elst || — || align=right | 9.2 km || 
|-id=868 bgcolor=#fefefe
| 10868 ||  || — || September 3, 1996 || Nachi-Katsuura || Y. Shimizu, T. Urata || V || align=right | 2.8 km || 
|-id=869 bgcolor=#fefefe
| 10869 ||  || — || September 21, 1996 || Xinglong || SCAP || FLO || align=right | 2.8 km || 
|-id=870 bgcolor=#fefefe
| 10870 Gwendolen ||  ||  || September 25, 1996 || NRC-DAO || G. C. L. Aikman || NYS || align=right | 2.1 km || 
|-id=871 bgcolor=#fefefe
| 10871 ||  || — || October 5, 1996 || Nachi-Katsuura || Y. Shimizu, T. Urata || NYS || align=right | 2.9 km || 
|-id=872 bgcolor=#E9E9E9
| 10872 Vaculík ||  ||  || October 12, 1996 || Kleť || J. Tichá, M. Tichý || — || align=right | 2.7 km || 
|-id=873 bgcolor=#fefefe
| 10873 ||  || — || October 11, 1996 || Kitami || K. Endate || NYS || align=right | 2.7 km || 
|-id=874 bgcolor=#fefefe
| 10874 Locatelli ||  ||  || October 4, 1996 || Kitt Peak || Spacewatch || — || align=right | 2.8 km || 
|-id=875 bgcolor=#E9E9E9
| 10875 Veracini ||  ||  || October 7, 1996 || Kitt Peak || Spacewatch || — || align=right | 6.9 km || 
|-id=876 bgcolor=#d6d6d6
| 10876 || 1996 UB || — || October 16, 1996 || Ōizumi || T. Kobayashi || — || align=right | 6.9 km || 
|-id=877 bgcolor=#E9E9E9
| 10877 Jiangnan Tianchi || 1996 UR ||  || October 16, 1996 || Nachi-Katsuura || Y. Shimizu, T. Urata || — || align=right | 6.5 km || 
|-id=878 bgcolor=#E9E9E9
| 10878 Moriyama || 1996 VV ||  || November 3, 1996 || Moriyama || Y. Ikari || — || align=right | 5.5 km || 
|-id=879 bgcolor=#d6d6d6
| 10879 ||  || — || November 6, 1996 || Ōizumi || T. Kobayashi || KOR || align=right | 7.4 km || 
|-id=880 bgcolor=#d6d6d6
| 10880 Kaguya ||  ||  || November 6, 1996 || Chichibu || N. Satō || KOR || align=right | 4.5 km || 
|-id=881 bgcolor=#E9E9E9
| 10881 ||  || — || November 4, 1996 || Oohira || T. Urata || ADE || align=right | 5.4 km || 
|-id=882 bgcolor=#E9E9E9
| 10882 Shinonaga ||  ||  || November 3, 1996 || Kitami || K. Endate, K. Watanabe || — || align=right | 11 km || 
|-id=883 bgcolor=#d6d6d6
| 10883 ||  || — || November 14, 1996 || Ōizumi || T. Kobayashi || THM || align=right | 11 km || 
|-id=884 bgcolor=#E9E9E9
| 10884 Tsuboimasaki ||  ||  || November 7, 1996 || Kitami || K. Endate, K. Watanabe || — || align=right | 5.2 km || 
|-id=885 bgcolor=#d6d6d6
| 10885 Horimasato ||  ||  || November 7, 1996 || Kitami || K. Endate, K. Watanabe || EOS || align=right | 11 km || 
|-id=886 bgcolor=#d6d6d6
| 10886 Mitsuroohba ||  ||  || November 10, 1996 || Nanyo || T. Okuni || — || align=right | 20 km || 
|-id=887 bgcolor=#d6d6d6
| 10887 ||  || — || December 12, 1996 || Oohira || T. Urata || — || align=right | 5.5 km || 
|-id=888 bgcolor=#d6d6d6
| 10888 Yamatano-orochi ||  ||  || December 6, 1996 || Nachi-Katsuura || Y. Shimizu, T. Urata || URS || align=right | 17 km || 
|-id=889 bgcolor=#d6d6d6
| 10889 ||  || — || January 2, 1997 || Ōizumi || T. Kobayashi || 3:2 || align=right | 33 km || 
|-id=890 bgcolor=#d6d6d6
| 10890 ||  || — || January 4, 1997 || Ōizumi || T. Kobayashi || — || align=right | 13 km || 
|-id=891 bgcolor=#fefefe
| 10891 Fink ||  ||  || August 30, 1997 || Caussols || ODAS || FLO || align=right | 2.1 km || 
|-id=892 bgcolor=#fefefe
| 10892 Gianna ||  ||  || September 23, 1997 || Farra d'Isonzo || Farra d'Isonzo || — || align=right | 3.3 km || 
|-id=893 bgcolor=#E9E9E9
| 10893 ||  || — || September 19, 1997 || Xinglong || SCAP || — || align=right | 4.2 km || 
|-id=894 bgcolor=#d6d6d6
| 10894 Nakai ||  ||  || September 30, 1997 || Kitt Peak || Spacewatch || — || align=right | 10 km || 
|-id=895 bgcolor=#fefefe
| 10895 Aynrand ||  ||  || October 11, 1997 || Rand || G. R. Viscome || FLO || align=right | 4.2 km || 
|-id=896 bgcolor=#fefefe
| 10896 ||  || — || October 26, 1997 || Nachi-Katsuura || Y. Shimizu, T. Urata || — || align=right | 3.1 km || 
|-id=897 bgcolor=#d6d6d6
| 10897 ||  || — || November 7, 1997 || Ōizumi || T. Kobayashi || KOR || align=right | 7.4 km || 
|-id=898 bgcolor=#fefefe
| 10898 ||  || — || November 23, 1997 || Ōizumi || T. Kobayashi || — || align=right | 3.2 km || 
|-id=899 bgcolor=#fefefe
| 10899 ||  || — || November 24, 1997 || Gekko || T. Kagawa, T. Urata || NYS || align=right | 2.4 km || 
|-id=900 bgcolor=#fefefe
| 10900 Folkner ||  ||  || November 30, 1997 || Ōizumi || T. Kobayashi || — || align=right | 6.9 km || 
|}

10901–11000 

|-bgcolor=#fefefe
| 10901 ||  || — || November 30, 1997 || Ōizumi || T. Kobayashi || — || align=right | 2.3 km || 
|-id=902 bgcolor=#fefefe
| 10902 ||  || — || November 25, 1997 || Xinglong || SCAP || — || align=right | 5.2 km || 
|-id=903 bgcolor=#E9E9E9
| 10903 ||  || — || November 24, 1997 || Kushiro || S. Ueda, H. Kaneda || — || align=right | 7.2 km || 
|-id=904 bgcolor=#fefefe
| 10904 ||  || — || November 29, 1997 || Socorro || LINEAR || MAS || align=right | 2.6 km || 
|-id=905 bgcolor=#fefefe
| 10905 ||  || — || November 29, 1997 || Socorro || LINEAR || — || align=right | 3.6 km || 
|-id=906 bgcolor=#E9E9E9
| 10906 ||  || — || November 29, 1997 || Socorro || LINEAR || — || align=right | 4.6 km || 
|-id=907 bgcolor=#d6d6d6
| 10907 Savalle ||  ||  || December 6, 1997 || Caussols || ODAS || — || align=right | 5.0 km || 
|-id=908 bgcolor=#d6d6d6
| 10908 Kallestroetzel ||  ||  || December 7, 1997 || Caussols || ODAS || — || align=right | 12 km || 
|-id=909 bgcolor=#fefefe
| 10909 ||  || — || December 5, 1997 || Dynic || A. Sugie || — || align=right | 6.1 km || 
|-id=910 bgcolor=#E9E9E9
| 10910 || 1997 YX || — || December 20, 1997 || Ōizumi || T. Kobayashi || — || align=right | 3.4 km || 
|-id=911 bgcolor=#fefefe
| 10911 Ziqiangbuxi ||  ||  || December 19, 1997 || Xinglong || SCAP || NYS || align=right | 8.4 km || 
|-id=912 bgcolor=#E9E9E9
| 10912 ||  || — || December 25, 1997 || Ōizumi || T. Kobayashi || — || align=right | 8.3 km || 
|-id=913 bgcolor=#E9E9E9
| 10913 ||  || — || December 31, 1997 || Ōizumi || T. Kobayashi || GEF || align=right | 8.0 km || 
|-id=914 bgcolor=#d6d6d6
| 10914 Tucker ||  ||  || December 31, 1997 || Prescott || P. G. Comba || THM || align=right | 7.7 km || 
|-id=915 bgcolor=#E9E9E9
| 10915 ||  || — || December 29, 1997 || Xinglong || SCAP || HEN || align=right | 4.2 km || 
|-id=916 bgcolor=#d6d6d6
| 10916 Okina-Ouna ||  ||  || December 31, 1997 || Chichibu || N. Satō || KOR || align=right | 6.1 km || 
|-id=917 bgcolor=#E9E9E9
| 10917 || 1998 AN || — || January 5, 1998 || Ōizumi || T. Kobayashi || — || align=right | 7.1 km || 
|-id=918 bgcolor=#d6d6d6
| 10918 Kodaly ||  ||  || January 1, 1998 || Kitt Peak || Spacewatch || THM || align=right | 7.8 km || 
|-id=919 bgcolor=#E9E9E9
| 10919 Pepíkzicha ||  ||  || January 10, 1998 || Ondřejov || L. Kotková || — || align=right | 10 km || 
|-id=920 bgcolor=#d6d6d6
| 10920 ||  || — || January 19, 1998 || Ōizumi || T. Kobayashi || THM || align=right | 16 km || 
|-id=921 bgcolor=#fefefe
| 10921 Romanozen ||  ||  || January 17, 1998 || Dossobuono || Madonna di Dossobuono Obs. || FLO || align=right | 2.4 km || 
|-id=922 bgcolor=#fefefe
| 10922 ||  || — || January 20, 1998 || Socorro || LINEAR || — || align=right | 4.9 km || 
|-id=923 bgcolor=#d6d6d6
| 10923 ||  || — || January 23, 1998 || Socorro || LINEAR || — || align=right | 10 km || 
|-id=924 bgcolor=#d6d6d6
| 10924 Mariagriffin ||  ||  || January 29, 1998 || Cocoa || I. P. Griffin || EOS || align=right | 7.0 km || 
|-id=925 bgcolor=#E9E9E9
| 10925 Ventoux ||  ||  || January 28, 1998 || Bédoin || P. Antonini || — || align=right | 5.2 km || 
|-id=926 bgcolor=#d6d6d6
| 10926 ||  || — || January 25, 1998 || Haleakalā || NEAT || — || align=right | 10 km || 
|-id=927 bgcolor=#E9E9E9
| 10927 Vaucluse ||  ||  || January 29, 1998 || Blauvac || R. Roy || — || align=right | 7.9 km || 
|-id=928 bgcolor=#E9E9E9
| 10928 Caprara ||  ||  || January 25, 1998 || Cima Ekar || M. Tombelli, G. Forti || DOR || align=right | 13 km || 
|-id=929 bgcolor=#d6d6d6
| 10929 Chenfangyun ||  ||  || February 1, 1998 || Xinglong || SCAP || THM || align=right | 13 km || 
|-id=930 bgcolor=#d6d6d6
| 10930 Jinyong ||  ||  || February 6, 1998 || Xinglong || SCAP || EOS || align=right | 8.5 km || 
|-id=931 bgcolor=#E9E9E9
| 10931 Ceccano || 1998 DA ||  || February 16, 1998 || Ceccano || G. Masi || — || align=right | 12 km || 
|-id=932 bgcolor=#fefefe
| 10932 Rebentrost ||  ||  || February 18, 1998 || Drebach || G. Lehmann || — || align=right | 7.5 km || 
|-id=933 bgcolor=#E9E9E9
| 10933 ||  || — || February 17, 1998 || Nachi-Katsuura || Y. Shimizu, T. Urata || — || align=right | 9.4 km || 
|-id=934 bgcolor=#d6d6d6
| 10934 Pauldelvaux ||  ||  || February 27, 1998 || La Silla || E. W. Elst || — || align=right | 17 km || 
|-id=935 bgcolor=#E9E9E9
| 10935 || 1998 EC || — || March 1, 1998 || Ōizumi || T. Kobayashi || — || align=right | 7.0 km || 
|-id=936 bgcolor=#fefefe
| 10936 ||  || — || March 22, 1998 || Nachi-Katsuura || Y. Shimizu, T. Urata || — || align=right | 11 km || 
|-id=937 bgcolor=#d6d6d6
| 10937 Ferris ||  ||  || August 27, 1998 || Anderson Mesa || LONEOS || — || align=right | 10 km || 
|-id=938 bgcolor=#d6d6d6
| 10938 Lorenzalevy ||  ||  || September 17, 1998 || Anderson Mesa || LONEOS || ALA || align=right | 24 km || 
|-id=939 bgcolor=#fefefe
| 10939 ||  || — || February 10, 1999 || Socorro || LINEAR || slow || align=right | 3.7 km || 
|-id=940 bgcolor=#fefefe
| 10940 ||  || — || February 10, 1999 || Socorro || LINEAR || FLO || align=right | 5.3 km || 
|-id=941 bgcolor=#d6d6d6
| 10941 ||  || — || February 12, 1999 || Socorro || LINEAR || — || align=right | 9.3 km || 
|-id=942 bgcolor=#E9E9E9
| 10942 ||  || — || February 10, 1999 || Socorro || LINEAR || — || align=right | 8.3 km || 
|-id=943 bgcolor=#fefefe
| 10943 Brunier ||  ||  || March 20, 1999 || Caussols || ODAS || — || align=right | 2.8 km || 
|-id=944 bgcolor=#E9E9E9
| 10944 ||  || — || March 19, 1999 || Socorro || LINEAR || — || align=right | 15 km || 
|-id=945 bgcolor=#d6d6d6
| 10945 ||  || — || April 14, 1999 || Nachi-Katsuura || Y. Shimizu, T. Urata || EOS || align=right | 9.1 km || 
|-id=946 bgcolor=#d6d6d6
| 10946 ||  || — || April 16, 1999 || Xinglong || SCAP || 627 || align=right | 16 km || 
|-id=947 bgcolor=#fefefe
| 10947 Kaiserstuhl || 2061 P-L ||  || September 24, 1960 || Palomar || PLS || — || align=right | 2.8 km || 
|-id=948 bgcolor=#fefefe
| 10948 Odenwald || 2207 P-L ||  || September 24, 1960 || Palomar || PLS || V || align=right | 3.4 km || 
|-id=949 bgcolor=#E9E9E9
| 10949 Königstuhl || 3066 P-L ||  || September 25, 1960 || Palomar || PLS || — || align=right | 10 km || 
|-id=950 bgcolor=#d6d6d6
| 10950 Albertjansen || 4049 P-L ||  || September 24, 1960 || Palomar || PLS || — || align=right | 8.1 km || 
|-id=951 bgcolor=#d6d6d6
| 10951 Spessart || 4050 P-L ||  || September 24, 1960 || Palomar || PLS || EOS || align=right | 6.3 km || 
|-id=952 bgcolor=#d6d6d6
| 10952 Vogelsberg || 4152 P-L ||  || September 24, 1960 || Palomar || PLS || — || align=right | 11 km || 
|-id=953 bgcolor=#fefefe
| 10953 Gerdatschira || 4276 P-L ||  || September 24, 1960 || Palomar || PLS || — || align=right | 1.9 km || 
|-id=954 bgcolor=#d6d6d6
| 10954 Spiegel || 4545 P-L ||  || September 24, 1960 || Palomar || PLS || KOR || align=right | 5.3 km || 
|-id=955 bgcolor=#E9E9E9
| 10955 Harig || 5011 P-L ||  || October 22, 1960 || Palomar || PLS || WIT || align=right | 3.5 km || 
|-id=956 bgcolor=#fefefe
| 10956 Vosges || 5023 P-L ||  || September 24, 1960 || Palomar || PLS || V || align=right | 1.6 km || 
|-id=957 bgcolor=#d6d6d6
| 10957 Alps || 6068 P-L ||  || September 24, 1960 || Palomar || PLS || — || align=right | 4.9 km || 
|-id=958 bgcolor=#fefefe
| 10958 Mont Blanc || 6188 P-L ||  || September 24, 1960 || Palomar || PLS || — || align=right | 4.5 km || 
|-id=959 bgcolor=#fefefe
| 10959 Appennino || 6579 P-L ||  || September 24, 1960 || Palomar || PLS || — || align=right | 7.4 km || 
|-id=960 bgcolor=#fefefe
| 10960 Gran Sasso || 6580 P-L ||  || September 24, 1960 || Palomar || PLS || — || align=right | 3.8 km || 
|-id=961 bgcolor=#fefefe
| 10961 Buysballot || 6809 P-L ||  || September 24, 1960 || Palomar || PLS || — || align=right | 1.8 km || 
|-id=962 bgcolor=#fefefe
| 10962 Sonnenborgh || 9530 P-L ||  || October 17, 1960 || Palomar || PLS || — || align=right | 4.4 km || 
|-id=963 bgcolor=#d6d6d6
| 10963 van der Brugge || 2088 T-1 ||  || March 25, 1971 || Palomar || PLS || EOS || align=right | 5.2 km || 
|-id=964 bgcolor=#E9E9E9
| 10964 Degraaff || 3216 T-1 ||  || March 26, 1971 || Palomar || PLS || HEN || align=right | 4.1 km || 
|-id=965 bgcolor=#d6d6d6
| 10965 van Leverink || 3297 T-1 ||  || March 26, 1971 || Palomar || PLS || — || align=right | 9.5 km || 
|-id=966 bgcolor=#d6d6d6
| 10966 van der Hucht || 3308 T-1 ||  || March 26, 1971 || Palomar || PLS || THM || align=right | 7.5 km || 
|-id=967 bgcolor=#E9E9E9
| 10967 Billallen || 4349 T-1 ||  || March 26, 1971 || Palomar || PLS || — || align=right | 7.8 km || 
|-id=968 bgcolor=#d6d6d6
| 10968 Sterken || 4393 T-1 ||  || March 26, 1971 || Palomar || PLS || THM || align=right | 7.1 km || 
|-id=969 bgcolor=#E9E9E9
| 10969 Perryman || 4827 T-1 ||  || May 13, 1971 || Palomar || PLS || — || align=right | 12 km || 
|-id=970 bgcolor=#E9E9E9
| 10970 de Zeeuw || 1079 T-2 ||  || September 29, 1973 || Palomar || PLS || — || align=right | 9.7 km || 
|-id=971 bgcolor=#fefefe
| 10971 van Dishoeck || 1179 T-2 ||  || September 29, 1973 || Palomar || PLS || NYS || align=right | 2.5 km || 
|-id=972 bgcolor=#fefefe
| 10972 Merbold || 1188 T-2 ||  || September 29, 1973 || Palomar || PLS || — || align=right | 5.3 km || 
|-id=973 bgcolor=#fefefe
| 10973 Thomasreiter || 1210 T-2 ||  || September 29, 1973 || Palomar || PLS || FLO || align=right | 3.4 km || 
|-id=974 bgcolor=#fefefe
| 10974 Carolalbert || 2225 T-2 ||  || September 29, 1973 || Palomar || PLS || NYS || align=right | 3.2 km || 
|-id=975 bgcolor=#E9E9E9
| 10975 Schelderode || 2246 T-2 ||  || September 29, 1973 || Palomar || PLS || — || align=right | 3.5 km || 
|-id=976 bgcolor=#E9E9E9
| 10976 Wubbena || 2287 T-2 ||  || September 29, 1973 || Palomar || PLS || WIT || align=right | 4.3 km || 
|-id=977 bgcolor=#fefefe
| 10977 Mathlener || 3177 T-2 ||  || September 30, 1973 || Palomar || PLS || — || align=right | 2.7 km || 
|-id=978 bgcolor=#d6d6d6
| 10978 Bärbchen || 4095 T-2 ||  || September 29, 1973 || Palomar || PLS || — || align=right | 7.3 km || 
|-id=979 bgcolor=#fefefe
| 10979 Fristephenson || 4171 T-2 ||  || September 29, 1973 || Palomar || PLS || SUL || align=right | 5.3 km || 
|-id=980 bgcolor=#fefefe
| 10980 Breimer || 4294 T-2 ||  || September 29, 1973 || Palomar || PLS || — || align=right | 2.6 km || 
|-id=981 bgcolor=#E9E9E9
| 10981 Fransaris || 1148 T-3 ||  || October 17, 1977 || Palomar || PLS || DOR || align=right | 9.8 km || 
|-id=982 bgcolor=#d6d6d6
| 10982 Poerink || 2672 T-3 ||  || October 11, 1977 || Palomar || PLS || THB || align=right | 10 km || 
|-id=983 bgcolor=#fefefe
| 10983 Smolders || 3196 T-3 ||  || October 16, 1977 || Palomar || PLS || MAS || align=right | 3.7 km || 
|-id=984 bgcolor=#FA8072
| 10984 Gispen || 3507 T-3 ||  || October 16, 1977 || Palomar || PLS || — || align=right | 2.4 km || 
|-id=985 bgcolor=#fefefe
| 10985 Feast || 4017 T-3 ||  || October 16, 1977 || Palomar || PLS || — || align=right | 4.0 km || 
|-id=986 bgcolor=#fefefe
| 10986 Govert || 4313 T-3 ||  || October 16, 1977 || Palomar || PLS || — || align=right | 3.0 km || 
|-id=987 bgcolor=#fefefe
| 10987 || 1967 US || — || October 30, 1967 || Hamburg-Bergedorf || L. Kohoutek || — || align=right | 4.7 km || 
|-id=988 bgcolor=#fefefe
| 10988 Feinstein || 1968 OL ||  || July 28, 1968 || El Leoncito || Félix Aguilar Obs. || — || align=right | 4.0 km || 
|-id=989 bgcolor=#C2FFFF
| 10989 Dolios ||  ||  || September 19, 1973 || Palomar || PLS || L4 || align=right | 24 km || 
|-id=990 bgcolor=#fefefe
| 10990 Okunev ||  ||  || September 28, 1973 || Nauchnij || N. S. Chernykh || — || align=right | 4.0 km || 
|-id=991 bgcolor=#fefefe
| 10991 Dulov ||  ||  || September 14, 1974 || Nauchnij || N. S. Chernykh || — || align=right | 4.3 km || 
|-id=992 bgcolor=#fefefe
| 10992 Veryuslaviya || 1974 SF ||  || September 19, 1974 || Nauchnij || L. I. Chernykh || ERI || align=right | 5.6 km || 
|-id=993 bgcolor=#fefefe
| 10993 || 1975 XF || — || December 1, 1975 || Cerro El Roble || C. Torres, S. Barros || FLO || align=right | 2.5 km || 
|-id=994 bgcolor=#d6d6d6
| 10994 Fouchard ||  ||  || March 15, 1978 || Palomar || S. J. Bus || KOR || align=right | 7.7 km || 
|-id=995 bgcolor=#d6d6d6
| 10995 || 1978 NS || — || July 10, 1978 || Palomar || E. F. Helin, E. M. Shoemaker || — || align=right | 6.9 km || 
|-id=996 bgcolor=#d6d6d6
| 10996 Armandspitz ||  ||  || July 7, 1978 || Palomar || S. J. Bus || — || align=right | 7.9 km || 
|-id=997 bgcolor=#E9E9E9
| 10997 Gahm ||  ||  || September 2, 1978 || La Silla || C.-I. Lagerkvist || — || align=right | 4.6 km || 
|-id=998 bgcolor=#d6d6d6
| 10998 ||  || — || October 27, 1978 || Palomar || C. M. Olmstead || — || align=right | 14 km || 
|-id=999 bgcolor=#E9E9E9
| 10999 Braga-Ribas ||  ||  || November 7, 1978 || Palomar || E. F. Helin, S. J. Bus || — || align=right | 7.9 km || 
|-id=000 bgcolor=#fefefe
| 11000 ||  || — || November 6, 1978 || Palomar || E. F. Helin, S. J. Bus || MAS || align=right | 2.4 km || 
|}

References

External links 
 Discovery Circumstances: Numbered Minor Planets (10001)–(15000) (IAU Minor Planet Center)

0010